= History of Beijing =

Historical Names of Beijing
Year	City Name	Dynasty	Notes
c. 11th century BC	City of Ji 蓟城	State of Ji (Zhou dynasty)	(Note: The City of Ji was the capital of the States of Ji and Yan.)
c. 7th century BC	City of Ji 蓟城	State of Yan (Zhou dynasty, Warring States)	
221 BC	City of Ji 蓟城	Qin	(Note: During the Qin dynasty, the City of Ji served as the regional capital of the Guangyang Commandery.)
206 BC	City of Ji 蓟城	State of Yan	(Note: One of the Eighteen Kingdoms during the wars of Chu–Han Contention.)
202 BC	City of Ji 蓟城	Han	
106 BC - 318 AD	City of Ji; Youzhou 幽州	Han, Wei, Western Jin (晋)	(Note: During the Eastern Han dynasty, Youzhou, as one of 12 prefectures, contained a dozen subordinate commanderies, including the Guangyang Commandery. In 24 AD, Liu Xiu moved Youzhou's prefectural seat from Ji County (in modern-day Tianjin) to the City of Ji (in modern-day Beijing). In 96 AD, the City of Ji served as the seat of both the Guangyang Commandery and Youzhou. The Wei Kingdom reorganized and decentralized the governance of commanderies under Youzhou. Guangyang Commandery became the State of Yan, which had four counties: Ji County, Changping, Jundu and Guangyang County, and was governed from the City of Ji. Fanyang Commandery was governed from Zhuo County. Yuyang Commandery was governed from Yuyuang (in modern-day Huairou District of Beijing), Shanggu Commandery was governed from Juyong (in modern-day Yanqing County of Beijing).)
319	City of Ji; Youzhou 幽州	Later Zhao	(Note: In 319, Shi Le captured Youzhou from Duan Pidi)
350	City of Ji; Youzhou 幽州	Eastern Jin (晋)	(Note: In 350, Murong Jun captured Youzhou in the name of restoring northern China to Jin rule.)
352–57	City of Ji; Youzhou 幽州	Former Yan	(Note: From 352 to 357, the Former Yan made the City of Ji its capital.)
370	City of Ji; Youzhou 幽州	Former Qin	(Note: In 319, Shi Le captured Youzhou from Duan Pidi)
385	City of Ji; Youzhou 幽州	Later Yan	(Note: In the second lunar month of 385, Murong Chui seized Youzhou from Former Qin.)
397	City of Ji; Youzhou 幽州	Northern Dynasties	(Note: In 397 AD, the Northern Wei captured Ji from the Later Yan and went on to establish the first of the Northern Dynasties.)
607	City of Ji	Sui	(Note: During the Sui dynasty, Youzhou became Zhuojun or Zhuo Commandery.)
616	Youzhou	Tang	(Note: During the Tang dynasty, the seat of the government of Youzhou remained in place but took on slightly different names. In 616, the government was called Youzhou Zongguanfu (幽州总管府); in 622, Youzhou Dazongguanfu (幽州大总管府); in 624, Youzhou Dadudufu (幽州大都督府) and in 626, Youzhou Dudufu (幽州都督府). From 710, the head of the government in Youzhou became a jiedushi, a military regional commander. In 742, Youzhou was renamed Fanyang Commandery (范阳郡). In 759, during the An-Shi Rebellion, Shi Siming declared himself emperor of the Great Yan dynasty and made Fanyang, Yanjing or "the Yan Capital." After the rebellion was suppressed, the seat of government became Youzhou Lulong Dudufu (幽州卢龙都督府).)
742	Fanyang 范阳; Youzhou	Tang	
759	Yanjing 燕京	Tang	
765	Youzhou	Tang	
907	Youzhou	Later Liang	
911-13	Youzhou	Yan (Five Dynasties)	
913	Youzhou	Later Liang, Later Tang, Later Jin (后晋)	
938	Nanjing 南京	Liao	(Note: The seat of government in Nanjing was known as Youdufu (幽都府) until 1012, when the name was changed to Xijinfu (析津府).)
1122	Nanjing 南京	Northern Liao	
1122	Yanjing	Jin (金)	
1122	Yanjing	Jin (金)	
1123	Yanshan 燕山	Song	
1125	Yanjing	Jin (金)	
1151	Zhongdu 中都	Jin (金)	(Note: After 1151, the capital of the Jin dynasty from Shangjing to Yanjing, which was renamed Zhongdu. Zhongdu refers to the Zhongdulu (中都路), an administrative unit which governed about 12 surrounding prefectures and 39 counties. The governing seat of Zhongdulu was Daxingfu (大兴府).)
1215	Yanjing	Yuan	
1271	Dadu (Khanbaliq) 大都	Yuan	
1368	Beiping 北平	Ming	(Note: The seat of government in Beiping, later Beijing, was called Shuntianfu (顺天府).)
1403	Beijing 北京	Ming	(Note: The seat of government in Beiping, later Beijing, was called Shuntianfu (顺天府).)
1420	Beijing 北京	Ming	(Note: The seat of government in Beiping, later Beijing, was called Shuntianfu (顺天府).)
1644	Beijing 北京	Qing	
1912	Beijing 北京	Republic of China	
1928	Beiping	Republic of China	
1937–40	Beijing	Republic of China	(Note: From 1937 to 1940, the city was renamed Beijing by the Provisional Government of the Republic of China, a puppet regime backed by the Japanese occupation. The city's name reverted to Beiping after the defeat of Japan in World War II.)
1945	Beiping	Republic of China	(Note: From 1937 to 1940, the city was renamed Beijing by the Provisional Government of the Republic of China, a puppet regime backed by the Japanese occupation. The city's name reverted to Beiping after the defeat of Japan in World War II.)
1949–present	Beijing	People's Republic of China	
Capital of regional dynasty or kingdom Capital of China

The city of Beijing has a long and rich history that dates back over 3,000 years.

Prior to the unification of China by the First Emperor in 221 BC, Beijing had been for centuries the capital of the ancient states of Ji and Yan. It was a provincial center in the earliest unified empires of China, Qin and Han. The northern border of ancient China ran close to the present city of Beijing, and northern nomadic tribes frequently broke in from across the border. Thus, the area that was to become Beijing emerged as an important strategic and a local political centre. During the first millennia of imperial rule, Beijing was a provincial city in northern China. Its stature grew in the 10th to the 13th centuries when the nomadic Khitan and forest-dwelling Jurchen peoples from beyond the Great Wall expanded southward and made the city a capital of their dynasties, the Liao and Jin. When Kublai Khan made Dadu the capital of the Mongol-led Yuan dynasty (1279–1368), all of China was ruled from Beijing for the first time. From 1279 onward, with the exception of two interludes from 1368 to 1420 and 1928 to 1949, Beijing would remain as China's capital, serving as the seat of power for the Ming dynasty (1421–1644), the Manchu-led Qing dynasty (1644–1912), the early Republic of China (1912–1928) and now the People's Republic of China (1949–present).

== Prehistory ==
The earliest remains of hominid habitation in Beijing Municipality were found in the caves of Dragon Bone Hill near the village of Zhoukoudian in Fangshan District, where the Homo erectus Peking Man (previously classified as the now-invalid species Sinanthropus pekinensis) lived from 770,000 to 230,000 years ago. Paleolithic homo sapiens also lived in the caves from about 27,000 to 10,000 years ago.

UNESCO World Heritage Site of Beijing
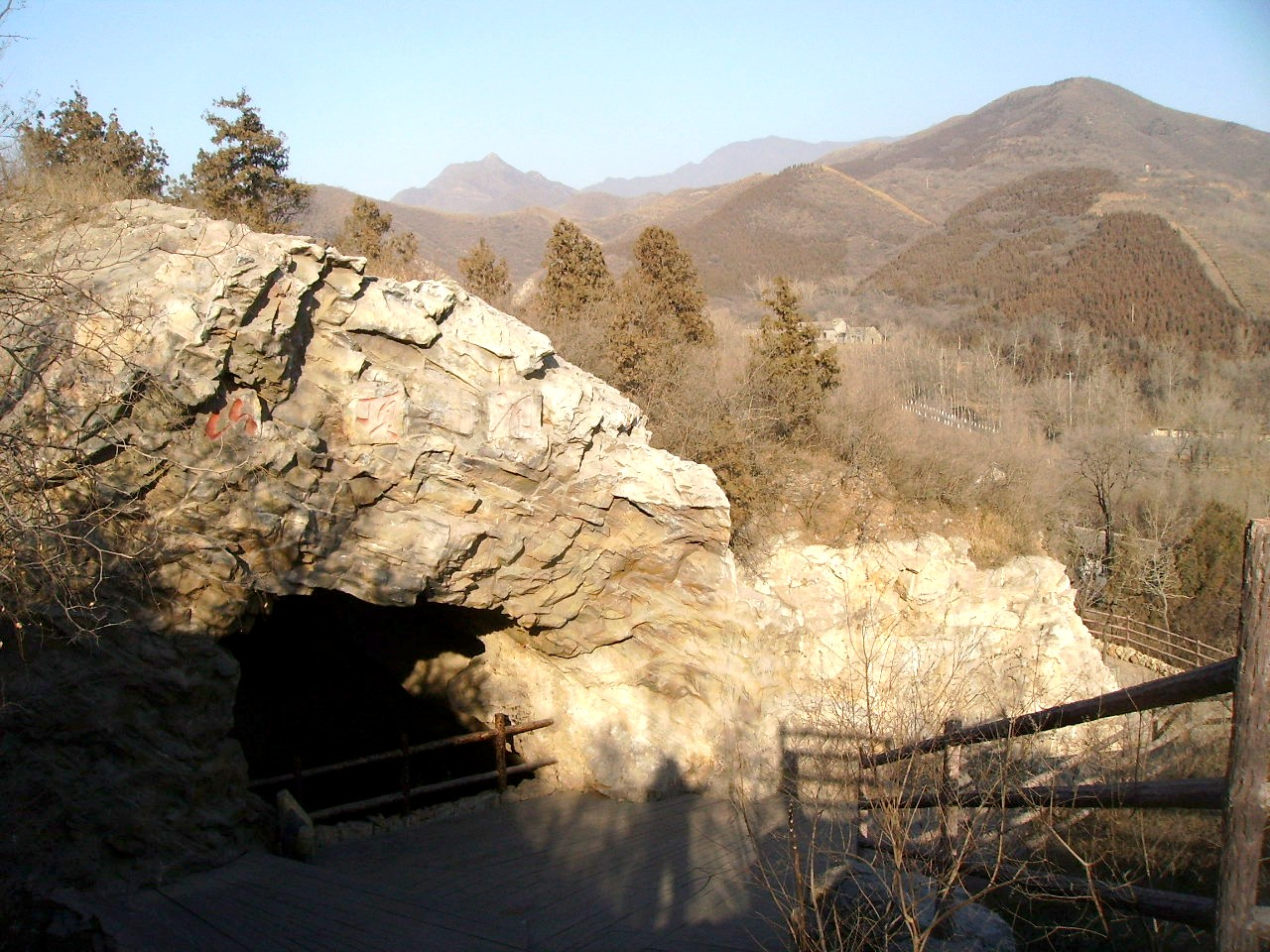
The Upper Cave on Dragon Bone Hill in Zhoukoudian where remains of the Peking Man were found.

In 1996, over 2,000 Stone Age tools and bone fragments were discovered at a construction site at Wangfujing in the heart of downtown Beijing in Dongcheng District. The artifacts date to 24,000 to 25,000 years ago and are preserved in the Wangfujing Paleolithic Museum in the lower level of the New Oriental Plaza mall.

Archaeologists have discovered over 40 neolithic settlements and burial sites throughout the municipality. The most notable include Zhuannian of Huairou District; Donghulin of Mentougou District; Shangzhai and Beiniantou of Pinggu District; Zhenjiangying of Fangshan; and Xueshan of Changping District. These sites indicate that farming was widespread in the area 6,000 to 7,000 years ago. Painted pottery and carved jade of the Shangzhai and Xueshan Cultures resemble those of the Hongshan Culture further to the north.

== Pre-imperial history ==
The Districts and Counties of Beijing Municipality

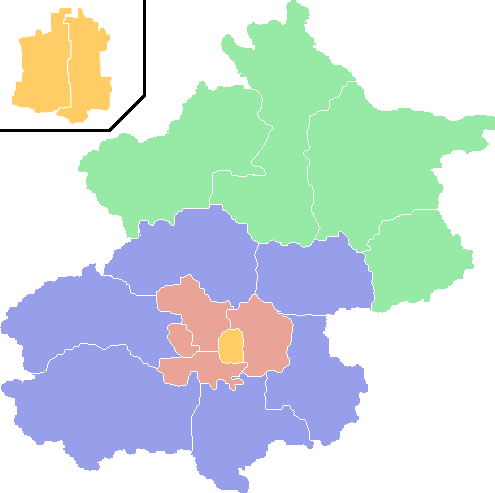

- Old city inside the 2nd Ring Road
- Urban districts between the 2nd & 5th Ring Road
- Inner suburbs linked by the 6th Ring Road
- Outer suburbs and rural areas.

The earliest events of Beijing's history are shrouded in legend and myth. The epic Battle of Banquan, which according to Sima Qian's Records of the Grand Historian, occurred in the 26th century BC, may have taken place near the Upper and Lower Banquan Villages of Yanqing County on the northwestern edge of Beijing Municipality. (Note: Other commonly cited locations for the Battle of Banquan are Zhuolu, Hebei Province and Yucheng in Shanxi Province.) The triumph of the Yellow Emperor over the Yan Emperor at Banquan united the two Emperors' tribes and gave rise to the Huaxia or Chinese nation, which then defeated Chiyou and the Nine Li tribes in the Battle of Zhuolu, possibly at Zhuolu, 75 km (47 mi) west of Yanqing in Hebei Province. This victory opened North China to settlement by the descendants of the Yan and Yellow Emperors.

The Yellow Emperor is said to have founded the settlement of Youling (幽陵) in or near Zhuolu. The sage-king Yao founded a town called Youdu (幽都) in the Hebei-Beijing region about 4,000 years ago. You (幽) or Youzhou (幽州) later became one of the historical names for Beijing. Yuzishan, in Shandongzhuang Village of Pinggu County, in the northeastern fringe of Beijing Municipality, is one of several places in China claiming to host the Yellow Emperor's Tomb. (Note: Although the Huangdi Mausoleum in Shaanxi Province is more famous, a study by the Beijing Academy of Social Sciences and the National History Museum in 1992 concluded that Yuzishan was likely to be the true location of the tomb.) Yuzishan's association with Yellow Emperor dates back at least 1,300 years when Tang poets Chen Zi'ang and Li Bai mentioned the tomb in their poems about Youzhou.

The first event in Beijing's history with archaeological support dates to the 11th century BC when the Zhou dynasty absorbed the Shang dynasty. According to Sima Qian, King Wu of Zhou, in the 11th year of his reign, deposed the last Shang king and conferred titles to nobles within his domain including the rulers of the city states Ji (薊) and Yan (燕). According to Confucius, King Wu of Zhou was so eager to establish his legitimacy that before dismounting his chariot, he named the descendants of the Yellow Emperor as the rulers of Ji. He then named his kinsman, Shi, the Duke of Shao, as the vassal of Yan. Shi was preoccupied with other matters and dispatched his eldest son to take the position. This son, Ke, is considered the founder of the state of Yan. Bronzeware inscriptions have confirmed these events described in Sima Qian's history. Although the dates in Sima Qian's history before 841 BC have not yet been definitely matched to the Gregorian Calendar, the Beijing Government uses 1045 BC as the official estimate of the date of this occasion.

It is believed that the seat of Ji, called the City of Ji or Jicheng (薊城), was located in the southwestern part of present-day urban Beijing, just south of Guang'anmen in Xicheng and Fengtai Districts. Several historical accounts mention a "Hill of Ji" northwest of the city, which would correspond to the large mound at the White Cloud Abbey outside Xibianmen, about 4 km (2.5 mi) north of Guang'anmen. (Note: In 284 BC, the victorious Yan general Yue Yi, having conquered 70 cities of neighboring Qi, wrote to Duke of Yan to report that he had enough booty to fill two palaces and planned to bring home a new tree species to plant on the Hill of Ji, north of the city.) South and west of Guang'anmen, roof tiles used for palace construction and dense concentrations of wells lined with ceramic ring tiles have been discovered.

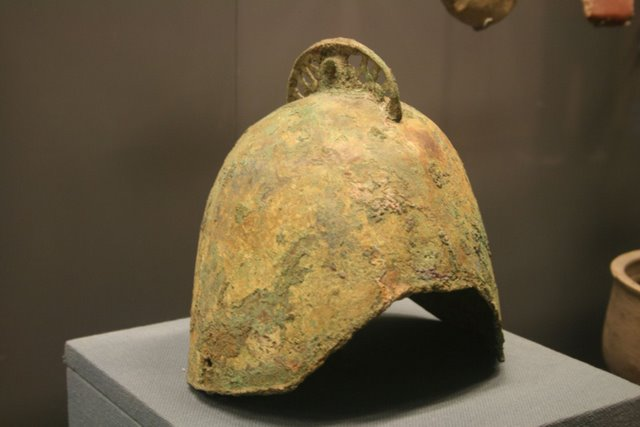
For several centuries before the unification of China in 221 BC, Beijing was the capital of the State of Yan. Bronze Yan helmet (above), sword-shaped Yan coins (right), and the Gefujia yun (far right), all from the Capital Museum.

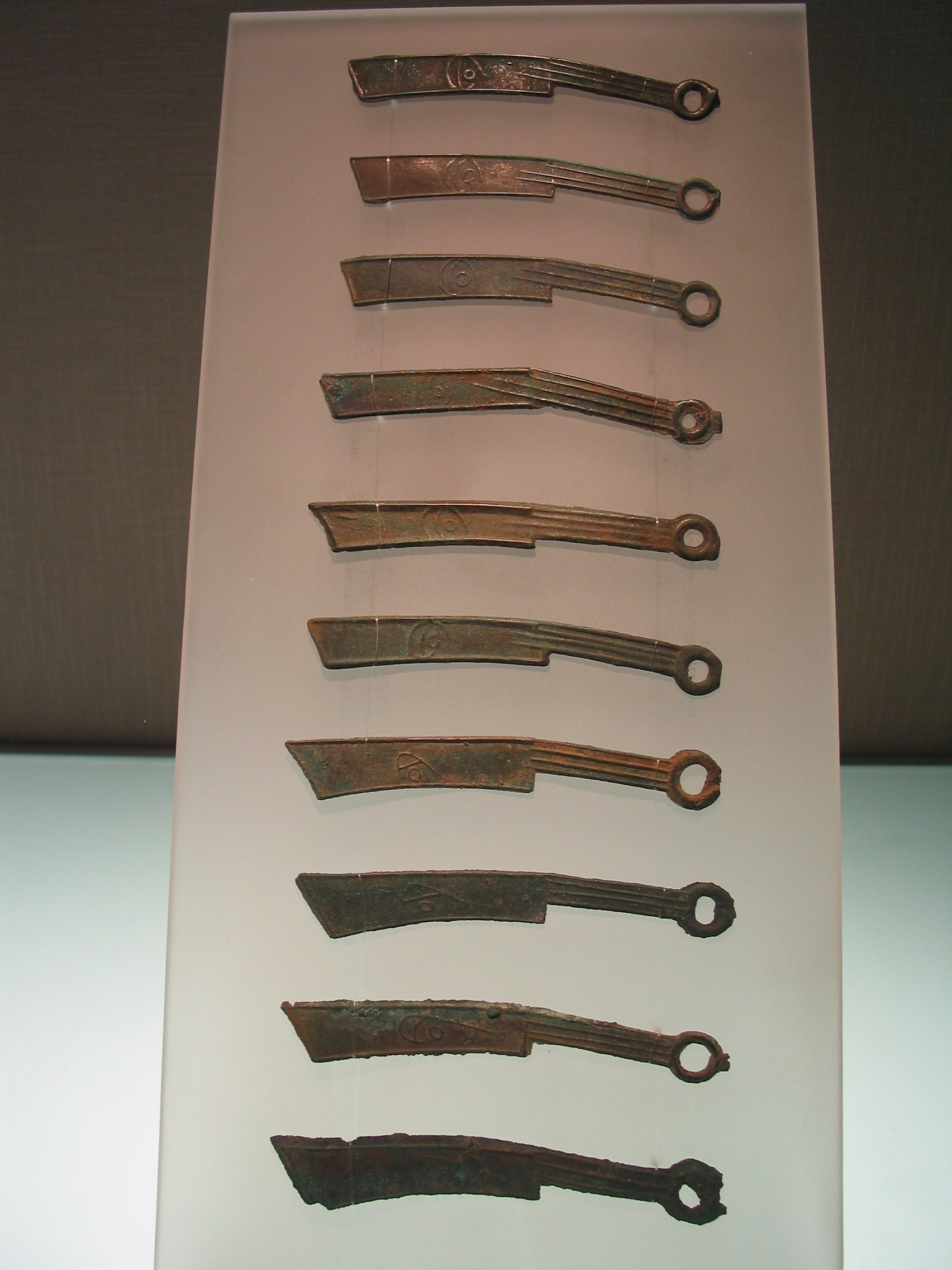

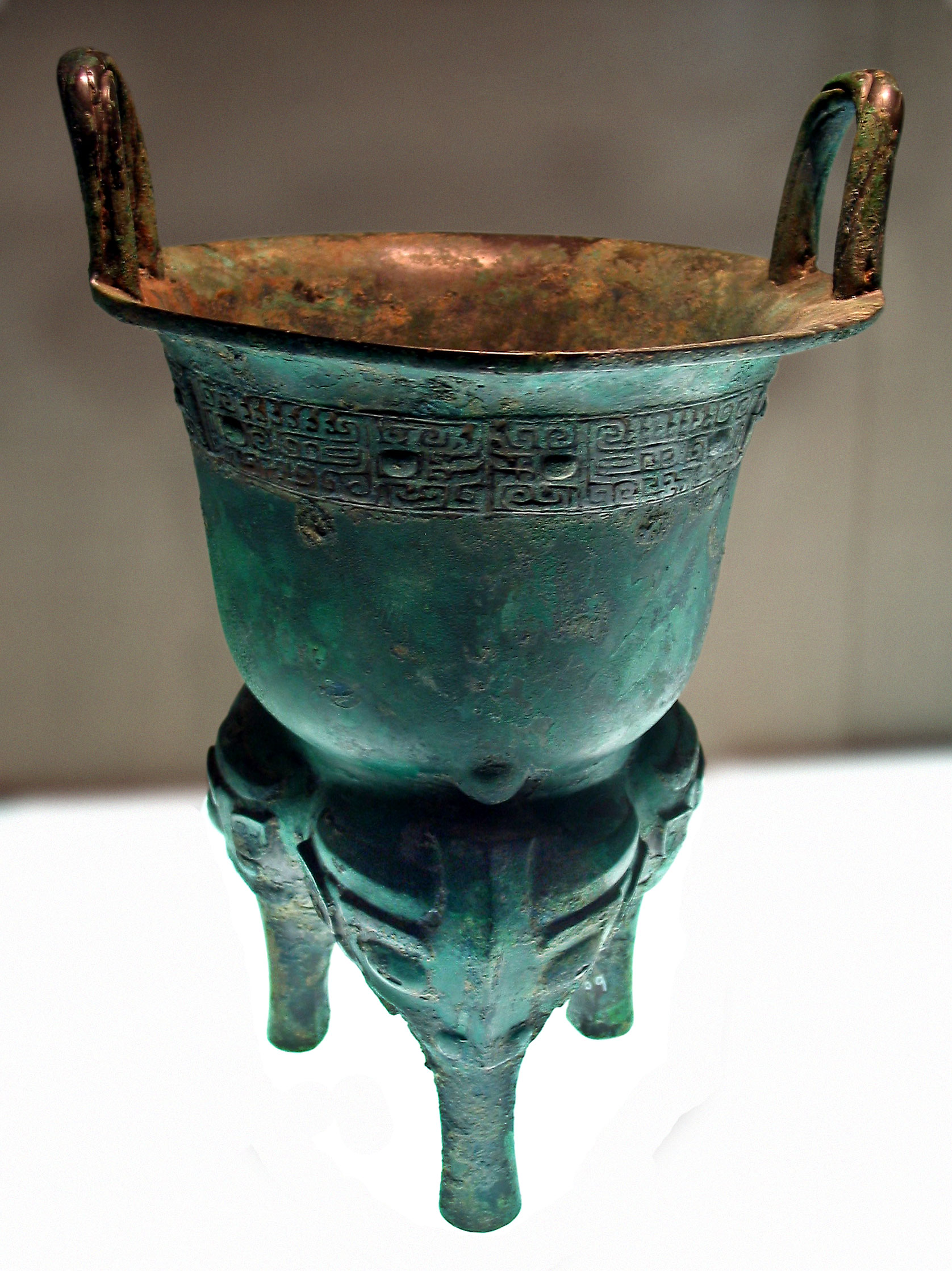
This bronze vessel used for steaming was unearthed from the Liulihe site in Fangshan District.

The capital of Yan was located about 45 km (28 mi) to the south of Ji, in the village of Dongjialin in Liulihe Township of Fangshan District, where a large walled settlement and over 200 tombs of nobility have been unearthed. Archaeological dating of the site, together with mentions of the name "Yan" in Shang oracle bones, indicates that Yan had already existed as a polity during the Shang period, though its earlier rulership could have been dismissed from power when the Zhou emerged victorious. Among the most significant artifacts from the Liulihe Site is the three-legged bronze Jin Ding whose inscriptions recount the journey of Jin, who was sent by Ji Ke to deliver a batch of food and drink to his father, Ji Shi, in the Zhou capital. The father was thrilled and awarded Jin cowry shells to pay for the creation of an honorific ding to remember the event. The inscription thus confirms the appointment of King Zhou's kin to Yan and the location of Yan's capital.

Both Yan and Ji were situated along an important north–south trade route along the eastern flank of the Taihang Mountains from the Central Plain to the northern steppes. Ji, located just north of the Yongding River, was a convenient rest stop for trade caravans. Here, the route to the northwest through the mountain passes diverged from the road to the Northeast. Ji also had a steady water supply from the nearby Lotus Pool, which still exists south of the Beijing West railway station. The Liulihe settlement relied on the more seasonal flow of the Liuli River. Some time during the Western Zhou or early Eastern Zhou dynasty, Yan conquered Ji and moved its capital to Ji, which continued to be called Jicheng or the City of Ji until the 2nd century AD. Due to its historical association with the State of Yan, the city of Beijing is also known as Yanjing (燕京) or the "Yan Capital." (Note: The State of Yan had several capitals beside the City of Ji. When Yan was threatened by the Shanrong nomads from the north during the reign of Duke Heng of Yan (698-691 BC), the capital was moved south to Linyi (臨易) in the present-day Hebei counties of Rongcheng and Xiong. When faced with the threat from the State of Qi from the south in the 530s BC, the capital returned to the north, either back to the City of Jicheng or the Ancient City of Doudian (窦店古城), a walled settlement also located in modern-day Liangxiang of Fangshan District. Historians sometimes refer to the City of Ji as the Shangdu (上都) or "Upper Capital" and the Ancient City of Doudian as Zhongdu (中都), or "Middle Capital." In the 4th century BC, Duke Shaoxiang of Yan established Xiadu (下都) or the "Lower Capital", a larger settlement south of Linyi, in modern day Yi County, Hebei Province. At the time of the Qin conquests in 226 BC, the capital was back in the City of Ji.)

The State of Yan continued to expand until it became one of the seven major powers during the Warring States period (473–221 BC). It stretched from the Yellow River to the Yalu. (Note: In the 3rd century BC, the Yellow River followed a more northerly course than the present day. It emptied into the Bohai Sea at a point south of Tianjin in what is now Hebei province as opposed Shandong Province today.) Like subsequent rulers of Beijing, the Yan also faced the threat of invasions by the Shanrong steppe nomads, and built walled fortifications across its northern frontier. Remnants of the Yan walls in Changping County date to 283 BC. They predate Beijing's better known Ming Great Wall by more than 1,500 years.

In 226 BC, the City of Ji fell to the invading State of Qin and the State of Yan was forced to move its capital to Liaodong. The Qin eventually ended Yan in 222 BC. The following year, the ruler of Qin, having conquered all the other states, declared himself to be the First Emperor.

== Early imperial history ==
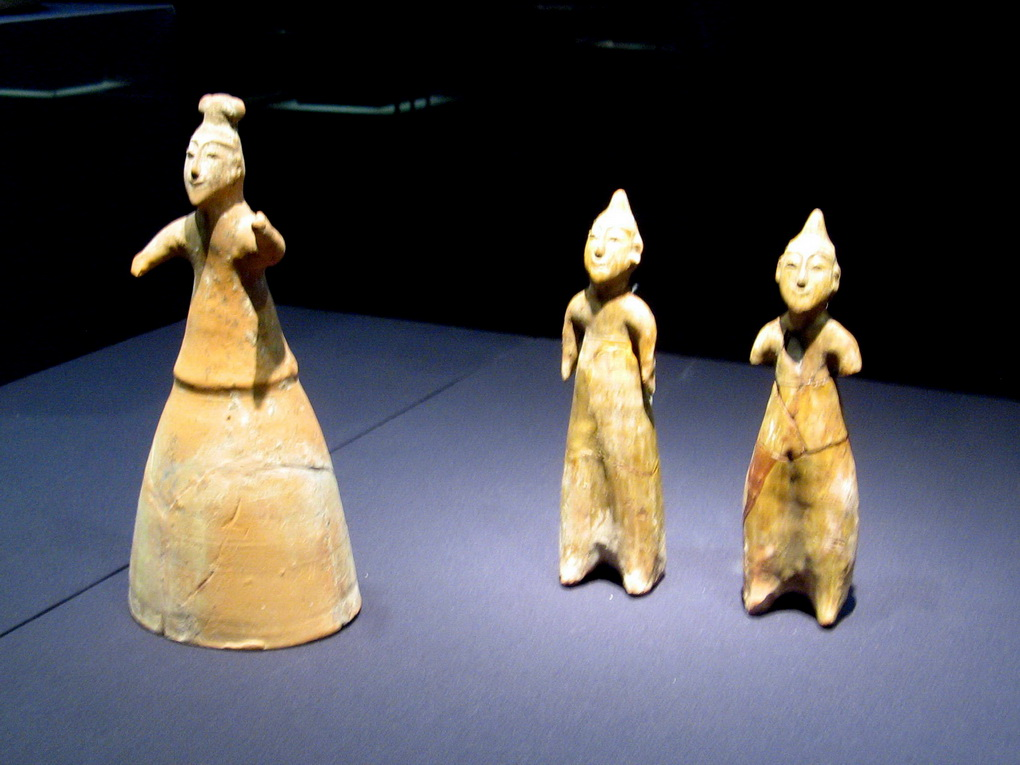
Celadon figurines from the Wei Kingdom of Three Kingdoms Period, discovered in Balizhuang of Haidian District, now located in the Haidian Museum.

During the first one thousand years of Chinese imperial history, Beijing was a provincial city on the northern periphery of China proper. Dynasties with capitals in the Central and Guanzhong Plains used the city to manage trade and military relations with nomadic peoples of the north and northeast.

The Qin dynasty built a highly centralized state and divided the country into 48 commanderies (jun), two of which are located in present-day Beijing. The City of Ji became the seat of Guangyang Commandery (广阳郡/廣陽郡). To the north, in present-day Miyun County, was Yuyang Commandery. The Qin removed defensive barriers dividing the Warring States, including the southern wall of the Yan, which separated the Beijing Plain from the Central Plain, and built a national roadway network. Ji served as the junction for the roads connecting the Central Plain with Mongolia and Manchuria. The First Emperor visited Ji in 215 BC and, to protect the frontier from the Xiongnu, had the Great Wall built in Yuyang Commandery and fortified Juyong Pass.

The Han dynasty, which followed the short-lived Qin in 206 BC, initially restored some local autonomy. Liu Bang, the founding emperor of the Han dynasty, recognized a number of regional kingdoms including Yan, ruled by Zang Tu, who had joined the revolt that overthrew the Qin, seized the City of Ji and sided with Liu Bang in the war with Xiang Yu for supremacy. But Zang rebelled and was executed, and Liu granted the kingdom to his childhood friend Lu Wan. Later, Liu became mistrustful of Lu, and the latter fled the City of Ji to join the Xiongnu tribes of the steppes. Liu Bang's eighth son took control of Yan, which was subsequently ruled by lineal princes of the imperial family, from the City of Ji, then known as Yan Commandery (燕郡), and the Principality of Guangyang (广阳国/廣陽國). In the early Western Han, the four counties of Guangyang Principality had 20,740 households and an estimated population of 70,685. (Note: Until the late Qing dynasty, the imperial census of the various dynasties counted only the number of taxable households in each administrative jurisdiction. To arrive at actual population figures, historical demographers have had to estimate the household size of each district in each era and add in the number of untaxed individuals, including imperial staff, religious personages and military personnel. Han Guanghui's 1996 compilation of historical census figures for Beijing provides two estimates for the city's population during each period: (1) the population within the walled city and (2) the population of the surrounding region that correspond, approximately, to the extent of modern Beijing Municipality.)

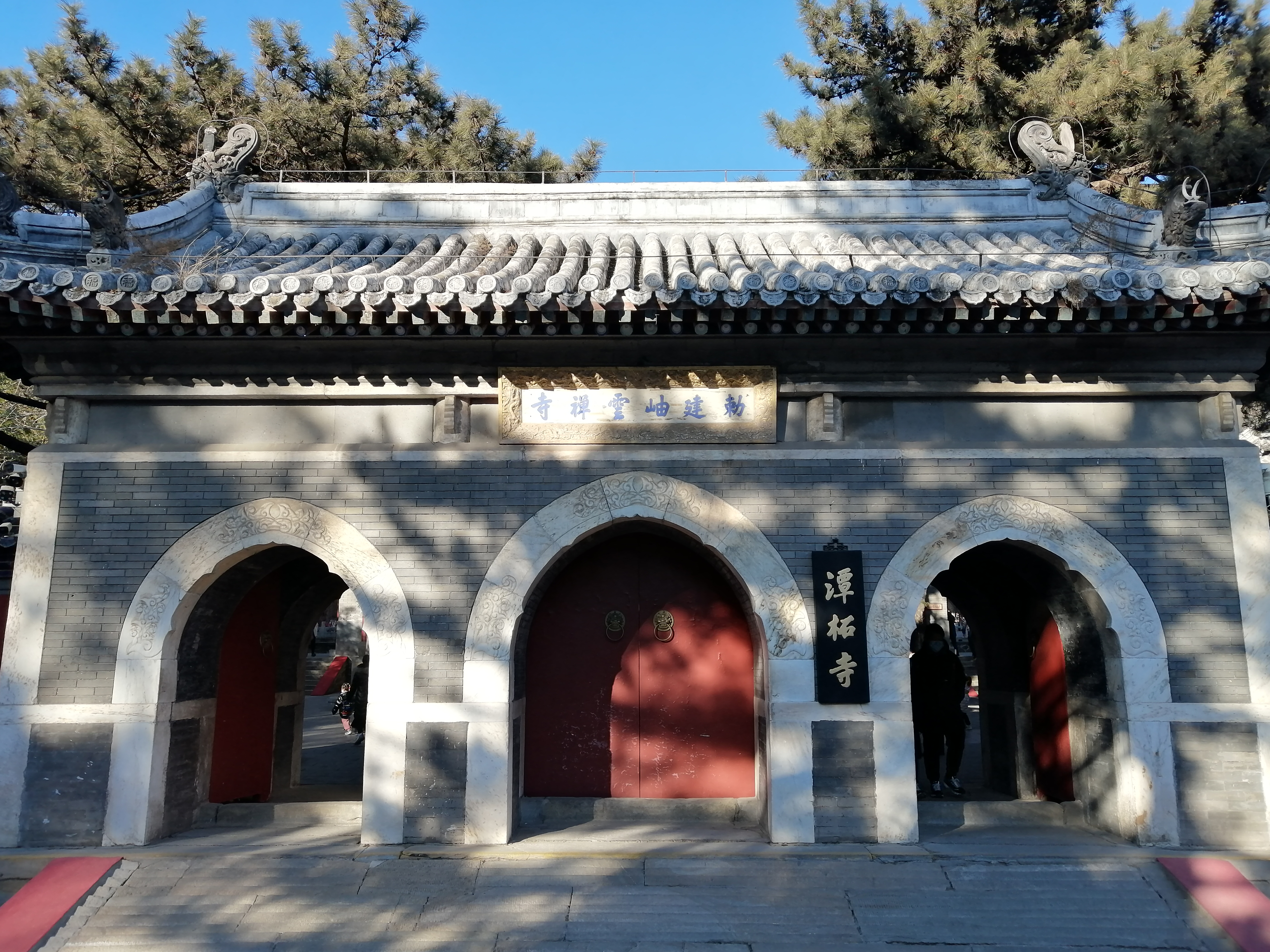
The Tanzhe Temple in Western Hills, founded in 307 in the Jin dynasty (266–420), is the oldest Buddhist temple in Beijing.

In 106 BC, under Emperor Wu, the country was organized into 13 prefectural-provinces, or zhou (州), and the City of Ji served as the provincial capital for Youzhou (幽州), the territories of which extended from what is now central Hebei Province to the Korean Peninsula. The tomb of Liu Jian, the Prince of Guangyang who ruled Youzhou from 73 to 45 BC was discovered in Fengtai District in 1974 and has been preserved in the Dabaotai Western Han Dynasty Mausoleum. In 1999, another royal tomb was found in Laoshan in Shijingshan District but the prince formerly buried there has not been identified.

During the early Eastern Han dynasty in 57 AD, the five counties of Guangyang Commandery had 44,550 households and an estimated 280,600 residents. By population density, Guangyang ranked in the top 20 among the 105 commanderies nationally. In the late Eastern Han, the Yellow Turban Rebellion erupted in Hebei in 184 AD and briefly seized Youzhou. The court relied on regional militaries to put down the rebellion and Youzhou was controlled successively by warlords Liu Yu, Gongsun Zan, Yuan Shao and Cao Cao. In 194 AD, Yuan Shao captured Ji from Gongsun Zan with the help of Wuhuan and Xianbei allies from the steppes. Cao Cao defeated Yuan Shao in 200 AD and the Wuhuan in 207 AD to pacify the north.

During the Three Kingdoms period, the Kingdom of Wei founded by Cao Cao's son, Cao Pi, controlled ten of the Han dynasty's prefectures including Youzhou and its capital Ji. The Wei court instituted offices in Youzhou to manage relations with the Wuhuan and Xianbei. To help sustain the troops garrisoned in Youzhou, the governor in 250 AD built the Lilingyan, an irrigation system that greatly improved agricultural output in the plains around Ji.

Ji was demoted to a mere county seat in the Western Jin dynasty, which made neighboring Zhuo County, in present-day Hebei Province, the prefectural capital of Youzhou. In the early 4th century, the Western Jin dynasty was overthrown by steppe peoples who had settled in northern China and established a series of mostly short-lived kingdoms. During the so-called Sixteen Kingdoms period, Beijing, still known as Ji, was controlled successively by the Di-led Former Qin, the Jie-led Later Zhao, and the Xianbei-led Former Yan and Later Yan. In 352, Prince Murong Jun, moved the capital of the Former Yan Kingdom from Manchuria to Ji, making the city a sovereign capital for the first time in over 500 years. Five years later, the Former Yan's capital was moved further south to Ye in southern Hebei. In 397 AD, the Northern Wei, another Xianbei regime, united northern China and restored Ji as the capital of Youzhou. While this designation continued through the remainder of the Northern Dynasties, the Eastern Wei, Northern Qi and Northern Zhou, the size of its jurisdiction shrank drastically, as the number of zhou in China was massively increased in this period, from 21 in the early 4th century to more than 200 in the late 6th century.

In 446, the Northern Wei built a Great Wall from Juyong Pass west to Shanxi to protect its capital, Datong, from the Rouran. In 553–56, the Northern Qi extended this Great Wall eastward to the Bohai Sea to defend against the Göktürks, who raided Youzhou in 564 and 578. Centuries of warfare severely depopulated northern China. During the Eastern Wei (534–550), Youzhou, Anzhou (modern Miyun) and East Yanzhou (modern Changping) had a combined 4,600 households and about 170,000 residents.

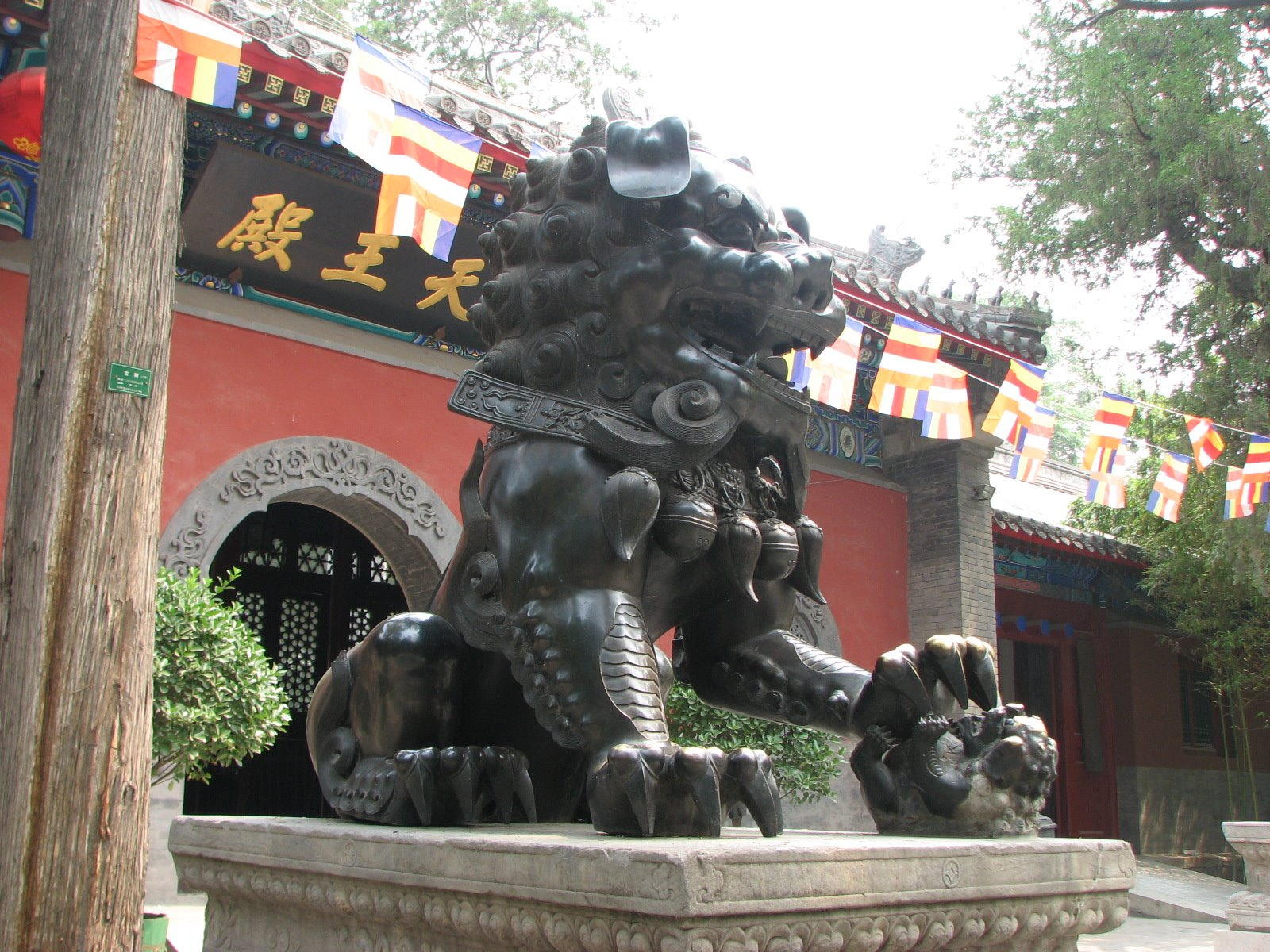
The Fayuan Temple in Xicheng District was first established by Emperor Taizong of the Tang dynasty in 645

After the Sui dynasty reunited China in 589 AD, Youzhou was renamed Zhuojun or the Zhuo Commandery (涿郡), which was administered from Ji. In 609, Zhuo Commandery and neighboring Anle Commandery (modern Miyun) had a combined 91,658 households and an estimated population of 458,000. Emperor Yang of Sui built a network of canals from the Central Plain to Zhuojun to carry troops and food for the massive military campaigns against Goguryeo (Korea). Though the campaigns proved to be ruinous, they were continued by the Tang dynasty. In 645 AD, the Emperor Taizong of the Tang dynasty founded the Minzhong Temple (now Fayuan Temple) in the southeast of Ji to remember the war dead from the Korean Campaigns. The Fayuan Temple, now within Xicheng District, is one of the oldest temples in urban Beijing.

The Tang dynasty reduced the size of a prefecture, as a unit of administration administrative division, from a province to a commandery and renamed Zhuojun back to Youzhou, which was one of over 300 Tang Prefectures. With the creation of a separate prefecture called Jizhou (薊州) in present-day Tianjin in 730, the name Ji was transplanted from Beijing to Tianjin, where a Ji County (蓟县) still exists today. In Beijing, the City of Ji gradually became known as Youzhou. During the prosperous early Tang, Youzhou's ten counties tripled in size from 21,098 households and about 102,079 residents to 67,242 households and 371,312 residents in 742. In 742, Youzhou was renamed Fanyang Commandery (范陽郡), but reverted to Youzhou in 762.

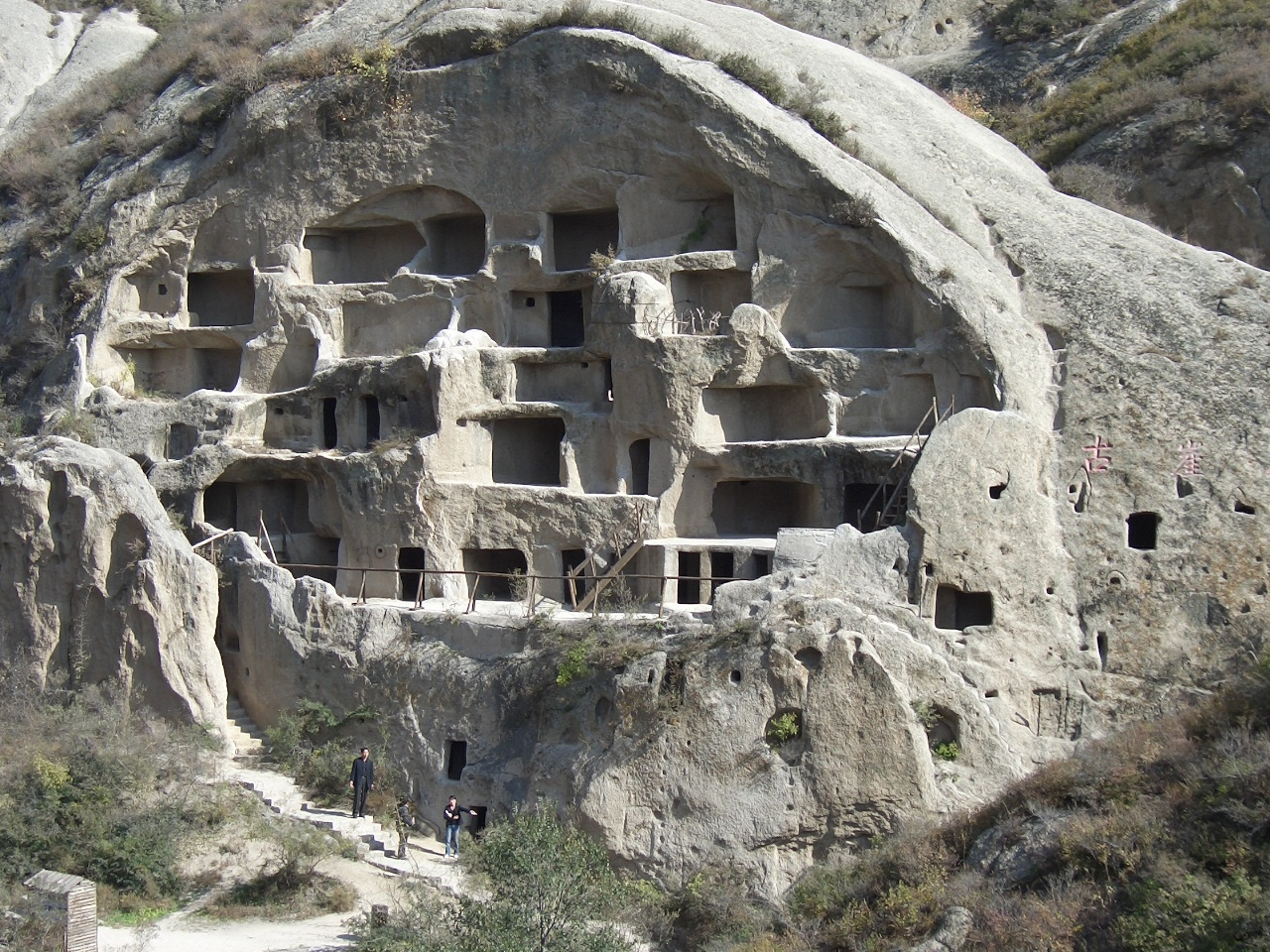
The mysterious Guyaju cave dwellings in Yanqing County are believed to be abode of the Xi people during the Tang and Five Dynasties period.

To guard against barbarian invasions, the imperial court created six frontier military commands in 711 AD, and Youzhou became the headquarters of the Youzhou Jiedushi, who was tasked to monitor the Khitan and Xi nomads just north of present-day Hebei Province. In 755, the Jiedushi An Lushan launched a rebellion from Youzhou, and declared himself the emperor of the Great Yan dynasty. He went on to conquer Luoyang and Xi'an with a multi-ethnic army of Han, Tongluo, Xi, Khitan and Shiwei troops. After An's death, Shi Siming continued the rebellion from Youzhou. Shi Siming's tomb was discovered in Wangzuo Village in Fengtai District in 1966 and excavated in 1981. The An–Shi Rebellion lasted eight years and severely weakened the Tang dynasty. For the next 150 years, military governors ruled Youzhou autonomously.

When the Tang dynasty was overthrown in 907 by the Later Liang dynasty, Youzhou remained independent and its military governor Liu Shouguang declared himself emperor of the short-lived Jie Yan dynasty in 911. This regime was ended in 913 by the ethnic Shatuo general Li Cunxu who went on to found the Later Tang dynasty in 923. The disintegration of the Tang dynasty into the Five Dynasties and Ten Kingdoms paved the way for Khitan expansion into northern China, which prompted the rise of Beijing in Chinese history.

The nomadic Khitan people were united under Yelü Abaoji, who founded the Liao dynasty in 916 and, from 917 to 928, tried seven times to take Youzhou. In 936, a rift in the Later Tang court allowed Yelü Abaoji to help another ethnic Shatuo general Shi Jingtang found the third of the Five Dynasties, the Later Jin. Shi Jingtang then ceded sixteen prefectures across the northern frontier including Youzhou, Shunzhou (modern Shunyi), Tanzhou (modern Changping) and Ruzhou (modern Yanqing) to the Liao dynasty.

== Liao, Song and Jin dynasties ==
Though Beijing was but a peripheral city to Chinese dynasties centered in Luoyang and Xi'an, it was an important entryway into China for tribal peoples to the north. The city's stature grew from the 10th century with successive invasions of China proper by the Khitans, Jurchens, and Mongols, who respectively founded the Liao dynasty, Jin dynasty and Yuan dynasty.

=== Liao Nanjing ===
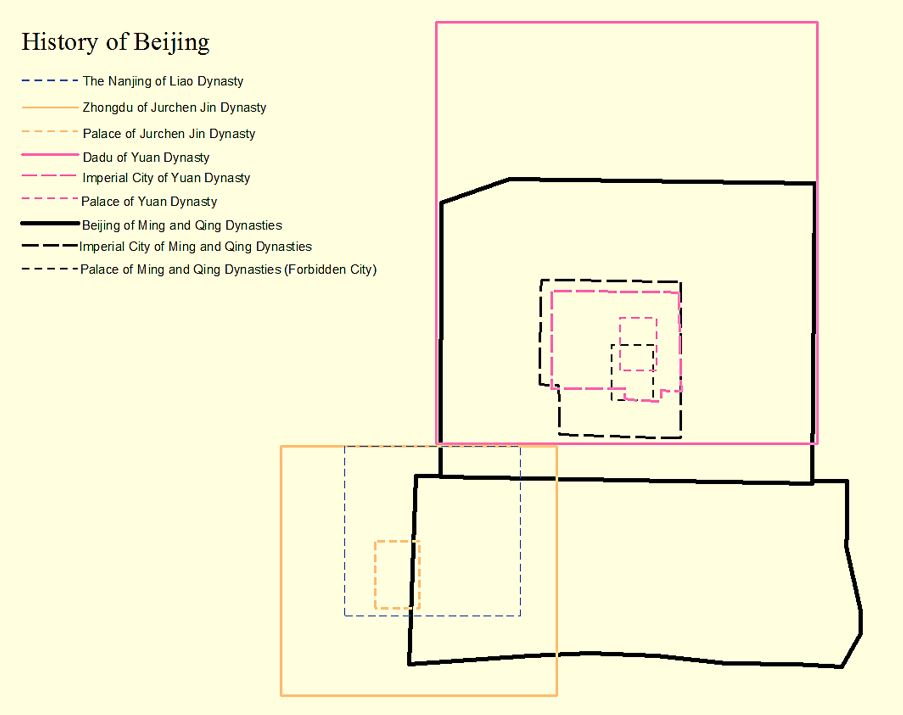
Map showing the change of the city walls in Beijing throughout Liao, Jurchen Jin, Yuan, Ming and Qing dynasties.

In 938, the Liao dynasty renamed Youzhou, Nanjing (南京) or the "Southern Capital" and made the city one of four secondary capitals to the primary seat of power at Shangjing (in modern-day Baarin Left Banner, Inner Mongolia). The Liao retained the Tang configuration of the city, which had eight gates in its outer wall, two in each cardinal direction, an inner walled city, which was converted into palace complex, and 26 residential neighborhoods.

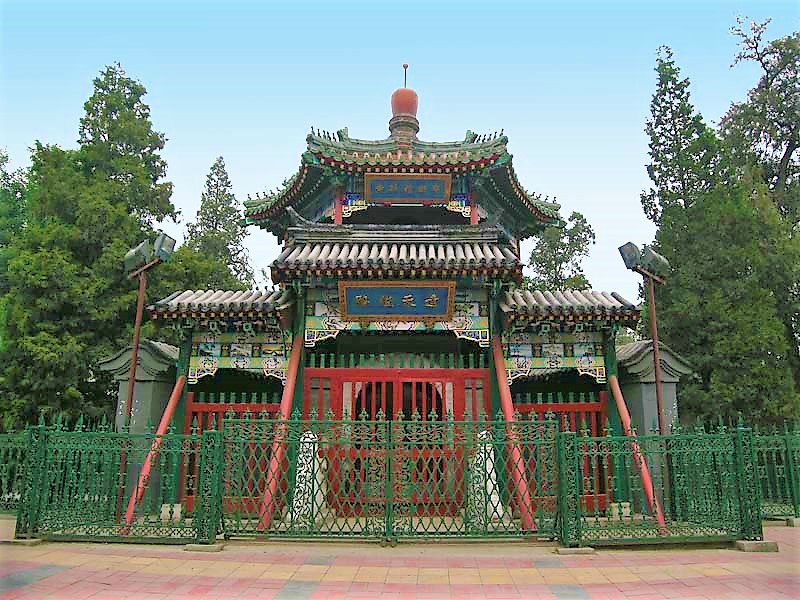
Niujie Mosque, the oldest mosque in Beijing, was founded in 996.

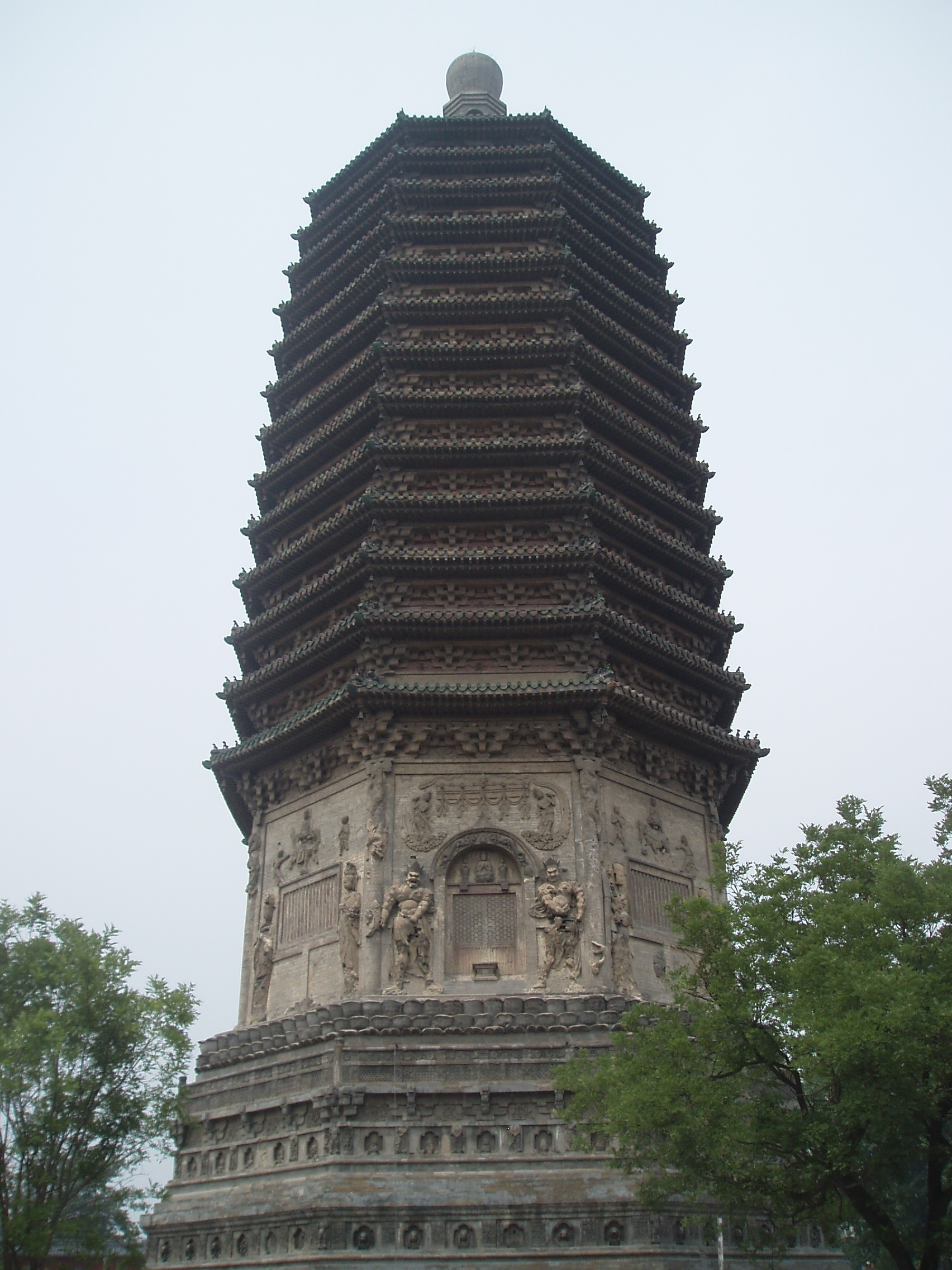
The Pagoda of Tianning Temple was built in 1120.

Thus, the City of Ji, ceded to the Liao as Youzhou, continued as Nanjing in what is today the southwest part of urban Beijing. Some of the oldest landmarks in southern Xicheng (formerly Xuanwu) and Fengtai Districts date to the Liao era. They include Sanmiao Road, one of the oldest streets in Beijing and the Niujie Mosque, founded in 996, and the Tianning Temple, built from 1100 to 1119. Under Liao rule, the population inside the walled city grew from 22,000 in 938 to 150,000 in 1113 (and the population of the surrounding region grew from 100,000 to 583,000) as large numbers of Khitan, Xi, Shiwei and Balhae from the north and Han from the south migrated to the city.

The Song dynasty, after unifying the rest of China in 960, sought to recapture the lost northern territories. In 979, Emperor Taizong personally led a military expedition that reached and laid siege to Nanjing (Youzhou) but was defeated in the decisive Battle of Gaoliang River, just northwest of present-day Xizhimen.

In 1120, the Song entered the Alliance on the Sea with the Jurchens, a semi-agricultural, forest-dwelling people living northeast of the Liao in modern-day Manchuria. The two nations agreed to jointly invade the Liao and split captured territories, with most of the Sixteen Prefectures going to the Song. Under the leadership of Wanyan Aguda, who founded the Jin dynasty (1115–1234), the Jurchens captured in rapid succession the Liao's Upper, Central and Eastern Capitals.

In the spring of 1122, the Liao court rallied around Prince Yelü Chun in Nanjing, and defeated two Song army advances. After Yelü Chun died of illness in the early summer, Guo Yaoshi, an ethnic Han commander in the Liao Army, defected to the Song and led the vanguard of the Song Army in a raid on Nanjing. The raiders entered the city, but the Liao Empress Xiao continued to resist from the walled palace complex. After three days of street fighting, Liao reinforcements reached the city ahead of the main Song Army, and managed to expel Guo Yaoshi's forces. In the winter of 1122, the Jin Army drove through the Juyong Pass and marched on Nanjing from the north. This time, Empress Xiao fled to the steppes and the remaining Liao officials capitulated. Wanyan Aguda allowed the surrendering officials to retain their positions and encouraged refugees to return to the city, which was renamed Yanjing.

=== Song Yanshan ===
In the spring of 1123, Wanyan Aguda agreed, as per treaty terms, to hand Yanjing and four other prefectures to the Song in exchange for tribute. The handover occurred after the Jurchens had looted the city's wealth and forced all officials and craftsman to move to the Jin capital at Shangjing (near present-day Harbin). Thus, the Song, having failed to take the city militarily from the Khitans, managed to purchase Yanjing from the Jurchens. Song rule of the city, renamed Yanshan (燕山), was short-lived.

As the convoy of relocated Nanjing residents passed Pingzhou (near Qinhuangdao) on their way to the Northeast, they persuaded the governor Zhang Jue to restore them to their home city. Zhang Jue, a former Liao official who had surrendered to the Jin dynasty, then switched his allegiance to the Song. Emperor Huizong welcomed his defection, ignoring warnings from his diplomats that the Jurchens would regard the acceptance of defectors as a breach of the treaty. The Jurchens defeated Zhang Jue who took refuge with Guo Yaoshi at Yanshan. The Song court had Zhang Jue executed to satisfy Jin demands, much to the alarm of Guo Yaoshi and other former Liao officials serving the Song.

The Jurchens, sensing Song weakness, used the Zhang Jue incident as a pretext to invade. In 1125, Jin forces defeated Guo Yaoshi at the Battle of the Bai River, on the upper reaches of the Chaobai River in modern Miyun County. Guo Yaoshi then surrendered Yanshan and then guided the Jin's rapid advance on the Song capital, Kaifeng, where the Song emperors Huizong and Qinzong were captured in 1127, ending the Northern Song dynasty. Yanshan was renamed Yanjing.

=== Jin Zhongdu ===
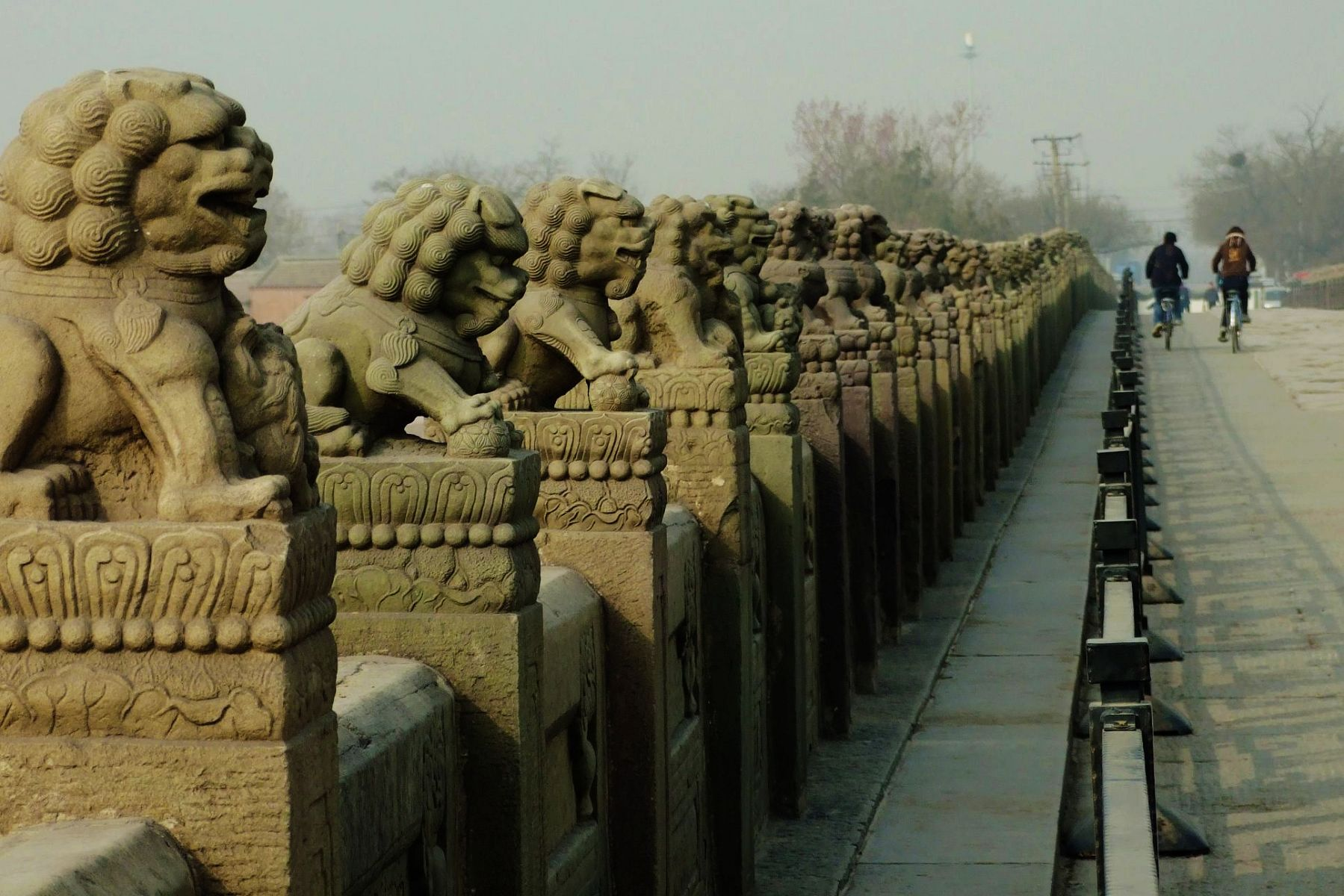
The Lugou Bridge, first built in 1189, dates to the Jin (金) dynasty (1115–1234).

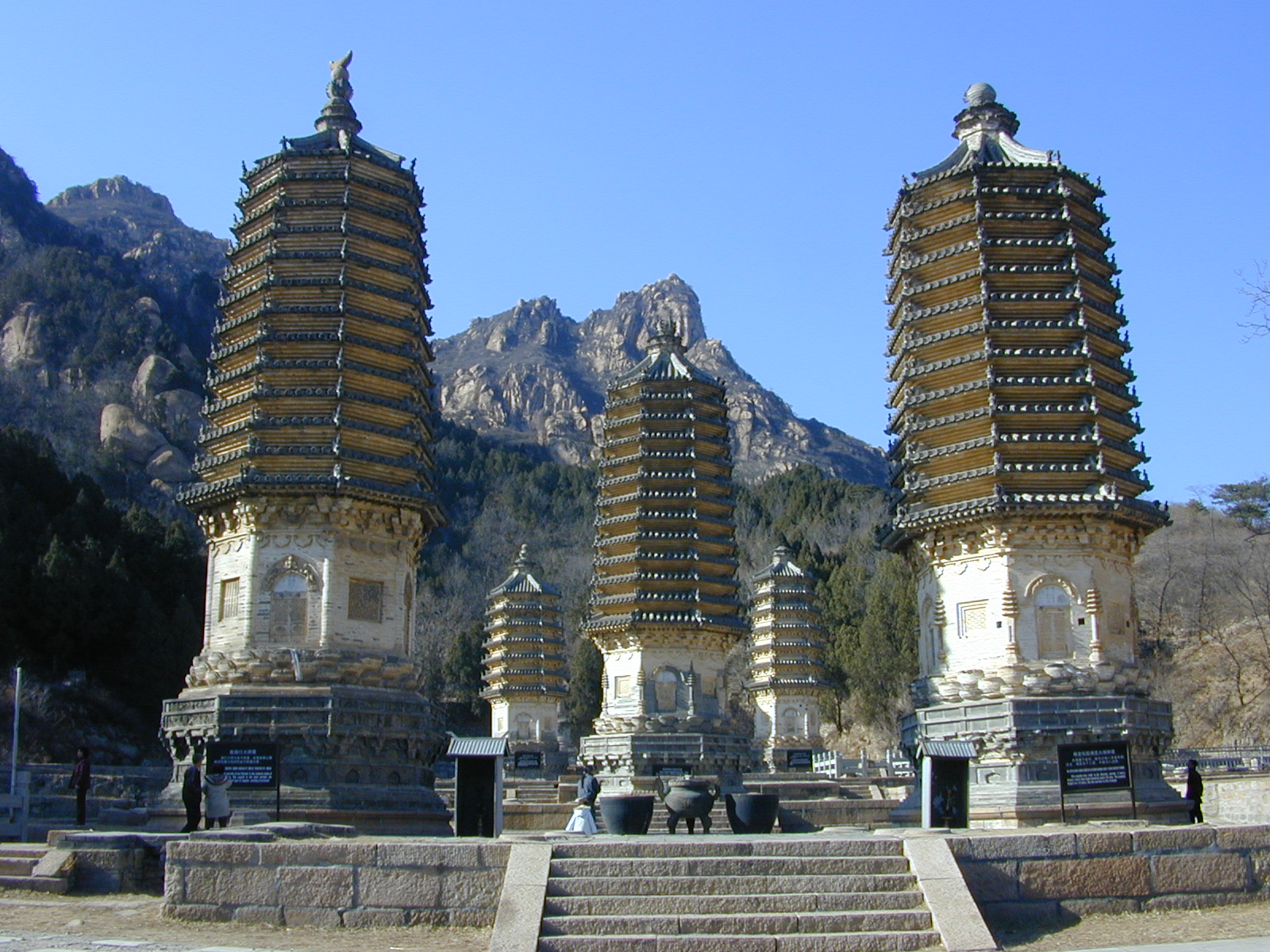
The Yinshan Pagoda Forest in Yanqing became a Buddhist sanctuary in the early 9th century. Of the seven pagodas standing today, five date to the Jin (金) dynasty (1115–1234) and two to the Yuan.

In 1153 the Jin emperor Wanyan Liang moved his capital from Shangjing to Yanjing and the city was renamed Zhongdu (中都) or the "Central Capital". For the first time in its history, the city of Beijing became a political capital of a major dynasty.

The Jin expanded the city to the west, east, and south, doubling its size. On today's map of urban Beijing, Zhongdu would extend from Xuanwumen in the northeast to the Beijing West railway station to the west, and south to beyond the southern 2nd Ring Road. The walled city had 13 gates, four in the north and three openings in each of the other sides. Remnants of Zhongdu city walls are preserved in Fengtai District. The Jin emphasized the centrality of the regime by placing the walled palace complex near the center of Zhongdu. The palace was situated south of present-day Guang'anmen and north of the Grand View Garden. In 1179, Emperor Zhangzong had a country retreat built northeast of Zhongdu. Taiye Lake was excavated along the Jinshui River and Daning Palace (大寧宮/大宁宫) was erected on Qionghua Island in the lake. (Note: The Daning Palace is also called the Taining, Shouan, and Wanning Palace.) The grounds of this palace is now Beihai Park.

Paper money was first issued in Beijing during the Jin. The Lugou Bridge, over the Yongding River southwest of the city, was built in 1189. Seventeen Jin emperors are buried in Fangshan District, including those whose tombs were originally built in Shangjing and moved to Zhongdu. The city's population grew from 82,000 in 1125 to 400,000 in 1207 (and from 340,000 in the surrounding region to 1.6 million).

Genghis Khan at Zhongdu

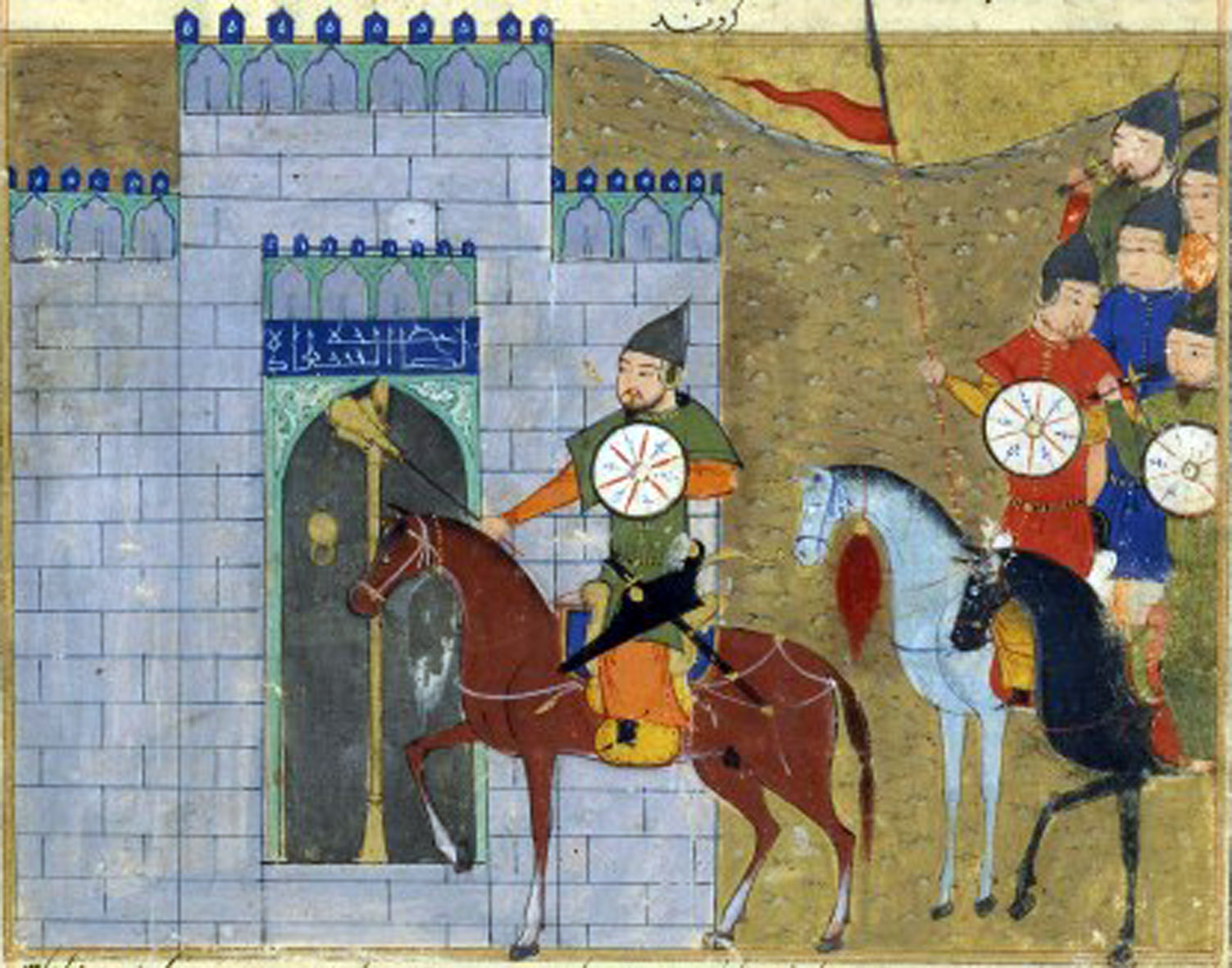
The first Mongol siege of Beijing in 1213–1214. The city fell in the second siege of 1214–1215.

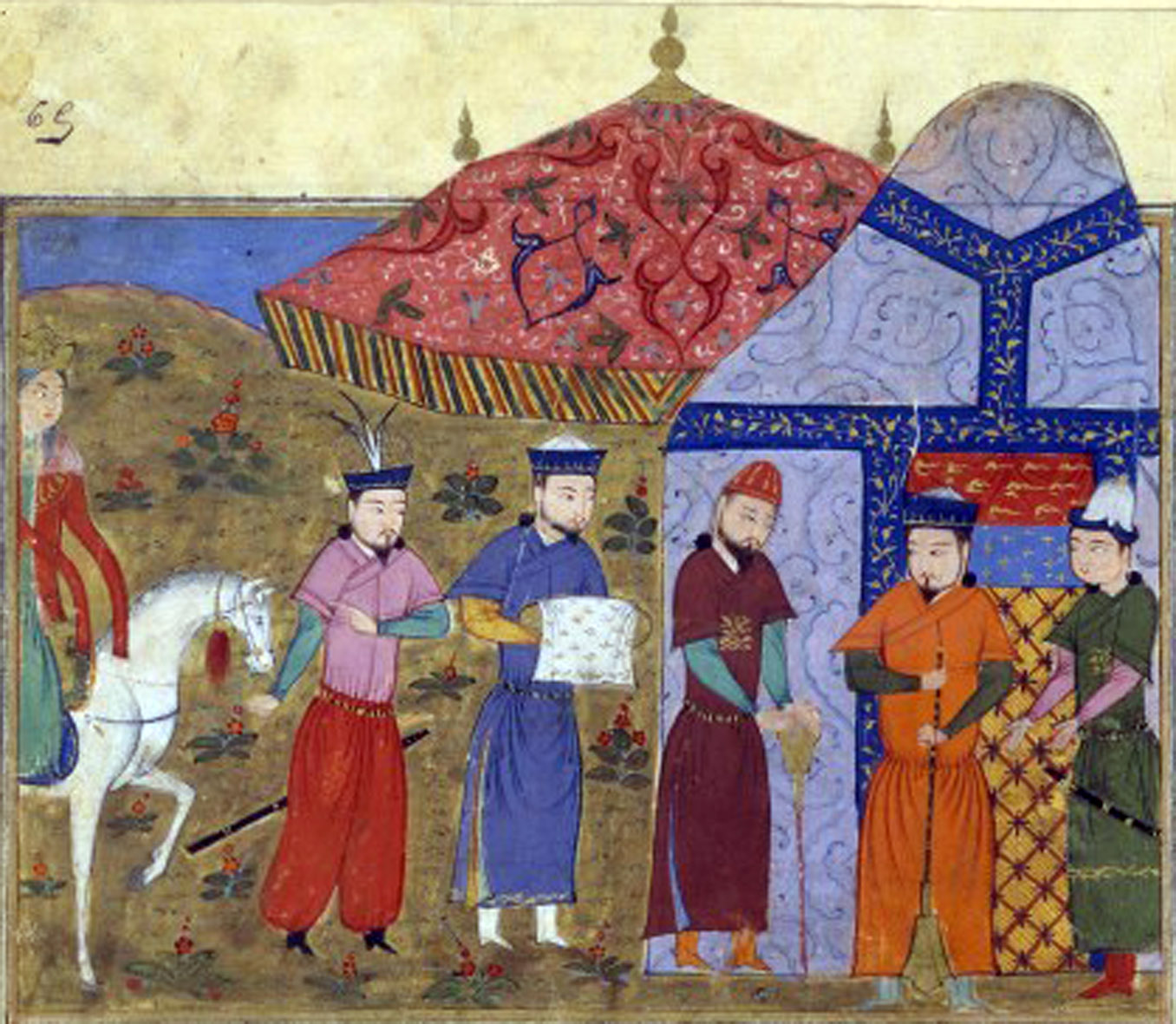
Genghis Khan receiving Jin envoys and the Qiguo Princess.

Illustrations from the Jami' al-tawarikh by Rashid-al-Din Hamadani Bibliothèque Nationale de France, Département des Manuscrits, Division Orientale.

Zhongdu served as the Jin capital for more than 60 years, until the onslaught of the Mongols in 1214. The Mongols, a tribal nomadic people from the Mongolian Plateau and southern Siberia, had assisted the Jurchen in the war against the Khitans, but were not given the promised compensation. In 1211, the Mongols led by Genghis Khan took revenge against the Jin by invading northern China. By 1213, he had controlled most of Jin territory north of the Yellow River with the exception of the capital Zhongdu. In March 1214, he set up headquarters in Zhongdu's northern suburbs and with brother Hasar and three eldest sons, Jochi, Chagatai and Ögedei, began to besiege the city. Though the Jin court was weakened by a palace coup, the city was protected by three layers of moats and 900 towers. When disease broke out within the Mongol ranks, Genghis Khan sent Muslim envoy Ja'far into the city to negotiate, and the Jin court agreed to a peace treaty by ceding territory and accepting vassal status. Among Genghis Khan's demands was marriage to a Jurchen princess. The Qicheng Princess, daughter of Wanyan Yongji, was designated for the Mongol chieftain. She along with 100 guards, 500 boys and girl servants, 3,000 bolts of cloth, and 3,000 horses were sent to the Mongol camp. The Qicheng Princess became one of the four main wives of Genghis Khan, who lifted the siege and withdrew north of the Juyong Pass.

Emperor Xuanzong, after considerable debate, decided to move the capital from Zhongdu to Kaifeng further to the south. In June 1214, as the Jin imperial procession departed the city, a detachment of Khitan guards rebelled at the Lugou Bridge and defected to the Mongols. Genghis Khan believed the Jin was trying to rebuild military strength further south in breach of the terms of peace and decided to reinvade the Jin. By winter, Mongol troops were again besieging Zhongdu.

In 1215, after a bitter siege in which many of the city's inhabitants starved, Zhongdu's 100,000 defenders and 108,000 households surrendered. The city was still looted and burned by the invaders. Zhongdu was renamed Yanjing and its population shrank to 91,000 in 1216 (with 285,000 in the surrounding region). Among the captives taken from the city was a Khitan named Yelü Chucai, who persuaded Genghis Khan that while China could be conquered from the saddle, it could not be ruled from the saddle. Rather than converting northern China into pastures, it would be more beneficial for Mongols to tax the agrarian population. Genghis Khan heeded the advice and the Mongol pillaging eased. The Mongols continued to the war against the Jurchens until the capture of Kaifeng in 1234 ended the Jin dynasty. Yelü Chucai was buried on the east bank of Kunming Lake in what is now the Summer Palace.

In 1219, Genghis Khan invited the Daoist sage Qiu Chuji for advice on "keeping the empire in good order." The 76-year old Qiu had previously declined invitations from the emperors of the Jin and Southern Song, but agreed to travel from Shandong to Yanjing and then to Central Asia, where, at the Mongol encampment in the Hindu Kush, he taught the Genghis Khan about the Dao, telling the great khan medicine for immortality did not exist and urged him to preserve lives. The Mongol leader called Qiu an immortal sage, made him the head Daoist priest of the empire and exempted Daoism from taxation. Qiu returned to Yanjing in 1224 and expanded what would become the White Cloud Temple, where he is buried and which is today the seat of the Chinese Daoist Association.

== Yuan dynasty ==
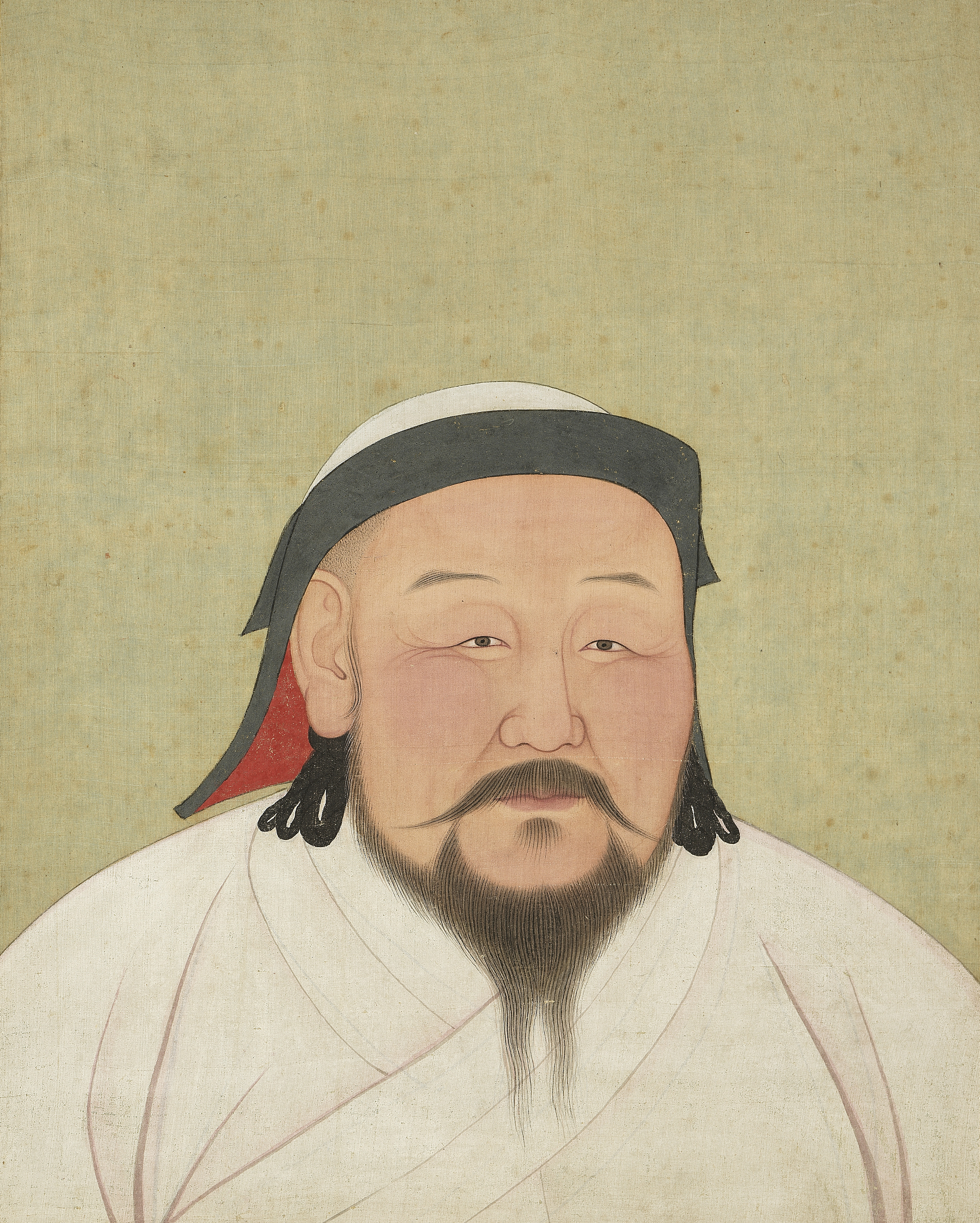
Kublai Khan made Beijing the capital of Yuan dynasty. (Portrait by Araniko in Dadu in 1294. Collections of the National Palace Museum)

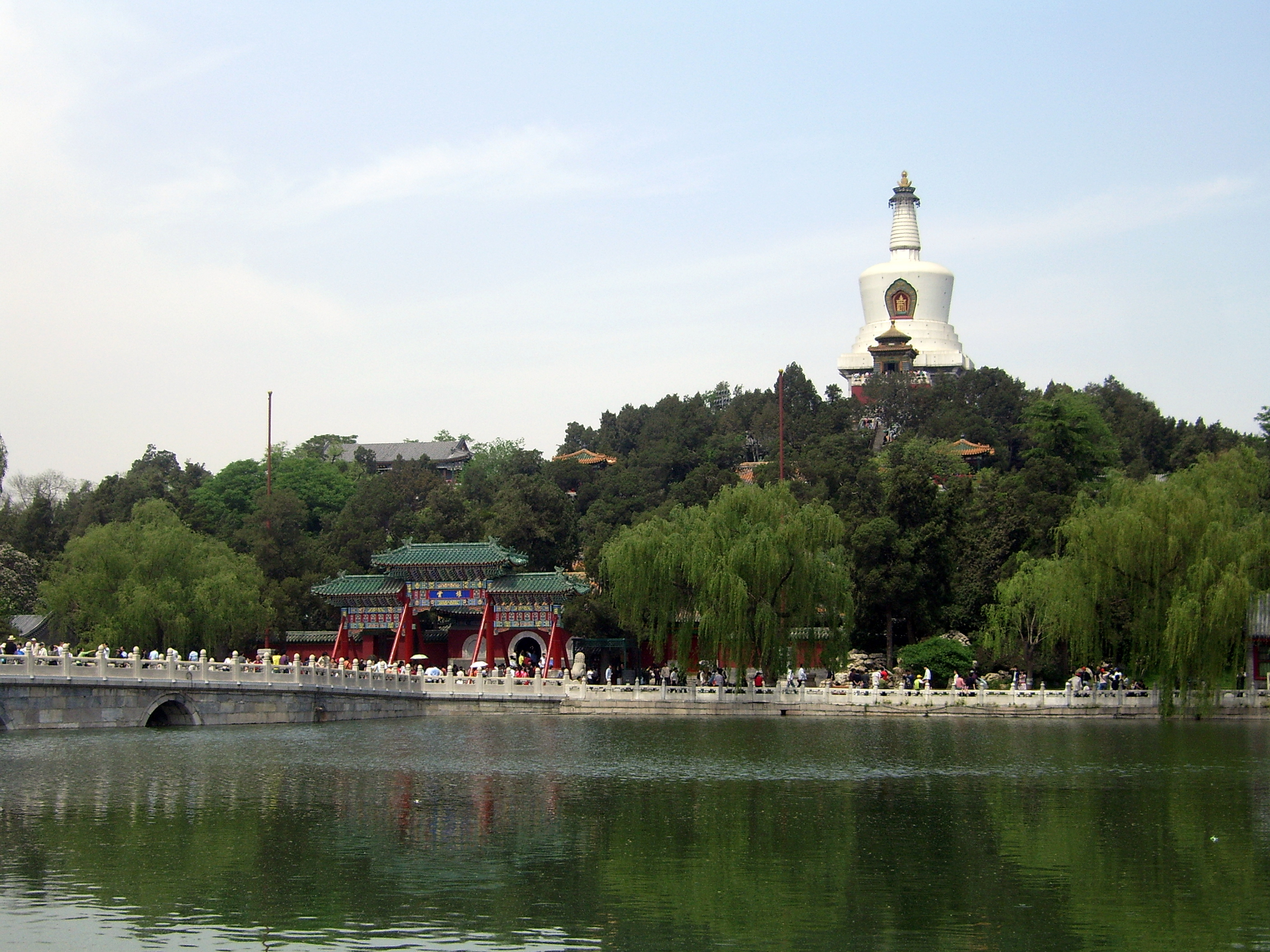
The White Dagoba on Qionghua Island in Beihai Park. On his first visit to Beijing in 1261, Kublai Khan stayed on this island, which was then a suburb of the city. He liked the surroundings and ordered that the new city be built around the island.

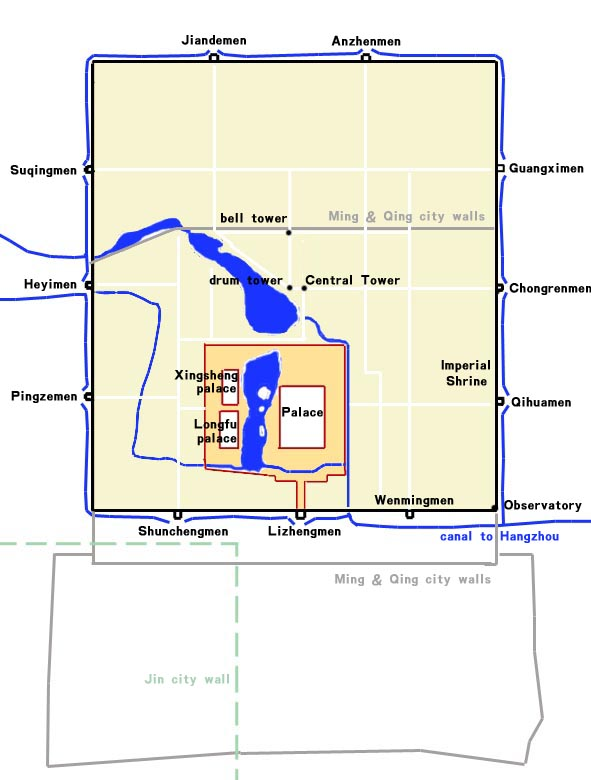
Map showing Dadu's city walls (black) and the imperial city (red), a partial outline of Zhongdu (dashed green) and the Ming & Qing city walls (grey). The Jinshui and Gaoliang rivers were made into a string of lakes and drained by the Tonghui Channel to the south.

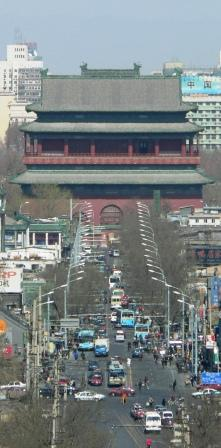
The Beijing Drum Tower, first built in 1272, marked the geographic center of Dadu. Di'anmen Outer Avenue still forms part of the city's north–south central axis.

When Kublai Khan, the grandson of Genghis Khan, visited Yanjing in 1261, much of the city lay in ruin, so he stayed in the Daning Palace on Qionghua Island. Unlike other Mongol leaders who wanted to retain the traditional tribal confederation based in Karakorum in Outer Mongolia, Kublai Khan was eager to become the emperor of a cosmopolitan empire. He spent the next four years waging and winning a civil war against rival Mongol chieftains and in 1264 ordered advisor Liu Bingzhong to build his new capital at Yanjing. In 1260, he had already begun construction of his capital at Xanadu, some 275 km (171 mi) due north of Beijing on the Luan River in present-day Inner Mongolia, but he preferred the location of Beijing. With the North China Plain opening to the south and the steppes just beyond the mountain passes to the north, Beijing was an ideal midway point for Kublai Khan's new seat of power.

In 1271, he declared the creation of the Yuan dynasty and named his capital Dadu (大都, Chinese for "Grand Capital", or Daidu to the Mongols). It is also known by the Mongol name Khanbaliq (汗八里), spelled Cambuluc in Marco Polo's account. Construction of Dadu began in 1267 and the first palace was finished the next year. The entire palace complex was completed in 1274 and the rest of the city by 1285. In 1279, when Mongol armies finished off the last of the Song dynasty in southern China, Beijing became for the first time, the capital of the whole of China. After the construction of Dadu, Xanadu, also known as Shangdu, became Kublai Khan's summer capital.

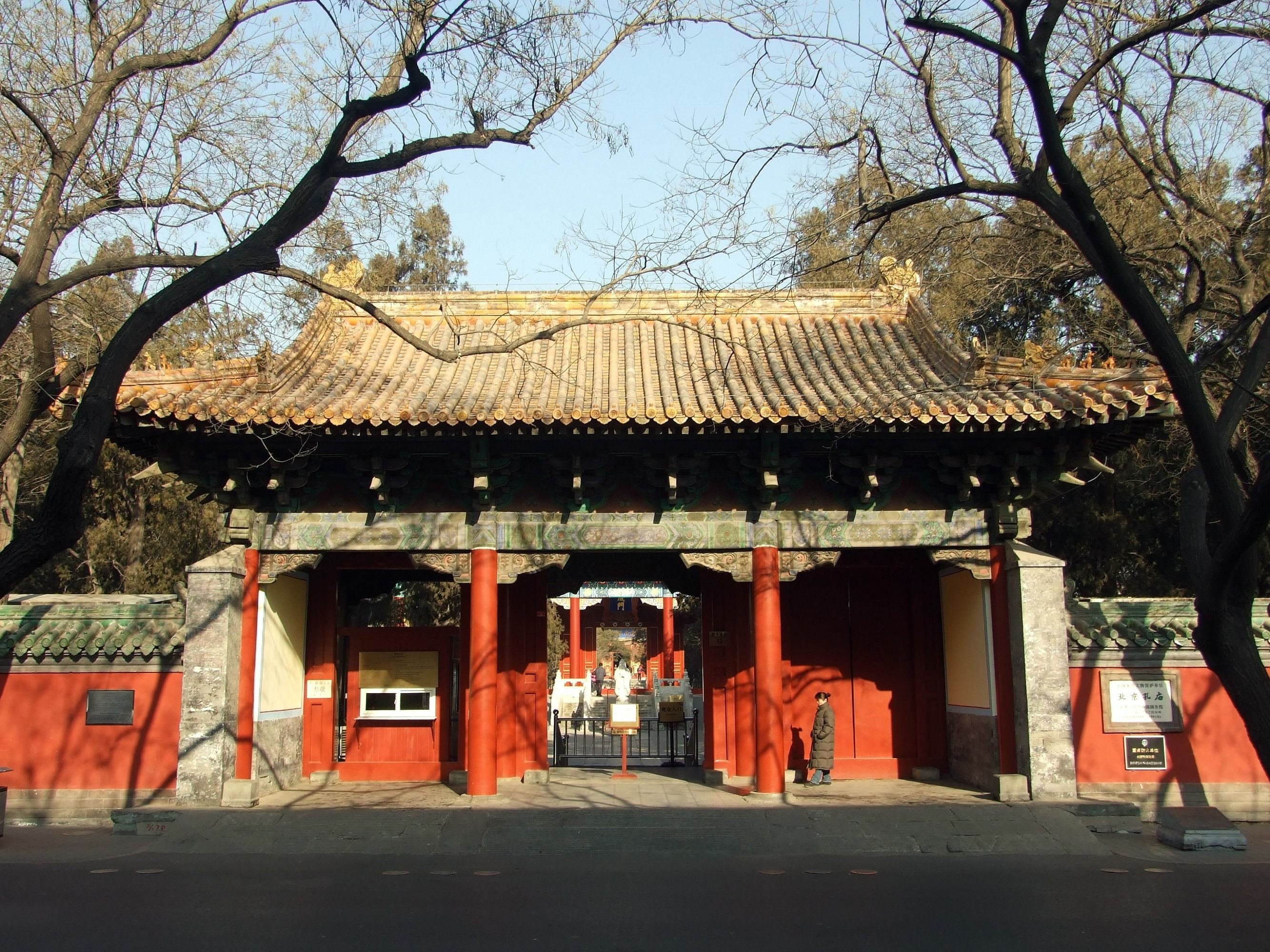
The Confucius Temple in Dongcheng District, firstly built in 1302 under Temür Khan (Emperor Chengzong) is the second largest in China. The temple houses 198 stone tabulets engraved with the names of 51,624 jinshi scholars of the Yuan, Ming and Qing dynasties.

Rather than continuing on the foundation of Zhongdu, the new capital Dadu was shifted to the northeast and built around the old Daning Palace on Qionghua Island in the middle of the Taiye Lake. This move set in place Beijing's current north–south central axis. Dadu was nearly twice the size of Zhongdu. It stretched from present-day Chang'an Avenue in the south to the earthen Dadu city walls that still stand in northern and northeastern Beijing, between the northern 3rd and 4th Ring Roads. The city had earthen walls 24 m thick and 11 city gates, two in the north and three each in the other cardinal directions. Later, the Ming dynasty lined portions of Dadu's eastern and western walls with brick and retained four of the gates. Thus, Dadu had the same width as the Beijing of the Ming and Qing dynasties. The geographic center of the Dadu was marked with a pavilion, which is now the Drum Tower.

The most striking physical feature of Dadu was the string of lakes in the heart of the city. These lakes were created from the Jinshui River (Note: Although called a river, the Jinshui was actually a Jin-era canal delivering water from a spring on Yuquan Mountain to the capital.) inside the city. They are now known as the six seas ("hai") of central Beijing: Houhai, Qianhai, and Xihai (the Rear, Front, and Western Seas) which are collectively known as Shichahai; Beihai (the North Sea); and Zhonghai and Nanhai which are collectively known as Zhongnanhai. Qionghua Island is now the island in Beihai Park on which the White Dagoba stands. Like today's Chinese leaders, the Yuan imperial family lived west of the lakes in the Xingsheng (兴圣宫) and Longfu (隆福宫) Palaces. A third palace east of the lakes, called the Danei (大内), at the site of the later Forbidden City, housed the imperial offices. The city's construction drew builders from all over the Mongols' Asian empire, including local Chinese as well as those from places such as Nepal and Central Asia. Liu Bingzhong was appointed as the supervisor of the construction of the imperial city and a chief architect was Yeheidie'erding. The pavilions of the palaces took on various architectural styles from across the empire. The entire palace complex occupied the south central portion of Dadu. Following Chinese tradition, the temples for ancestral rites and harvest rites were built, respectively, to west and east of the palace.

UNESCO World Heritage Site of Beijing

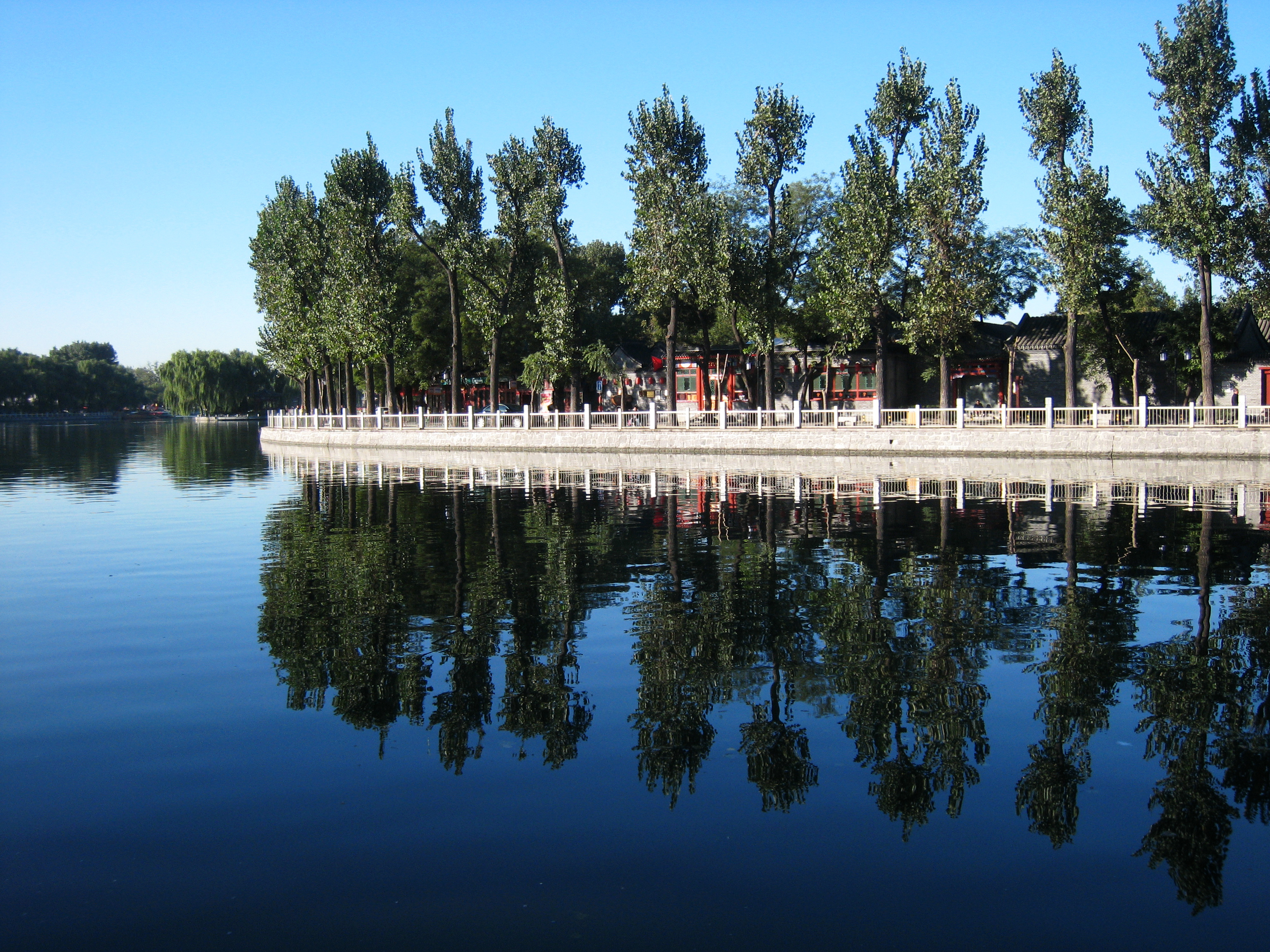
Shichahai, part of the Old Beijing section of the Grand Canal

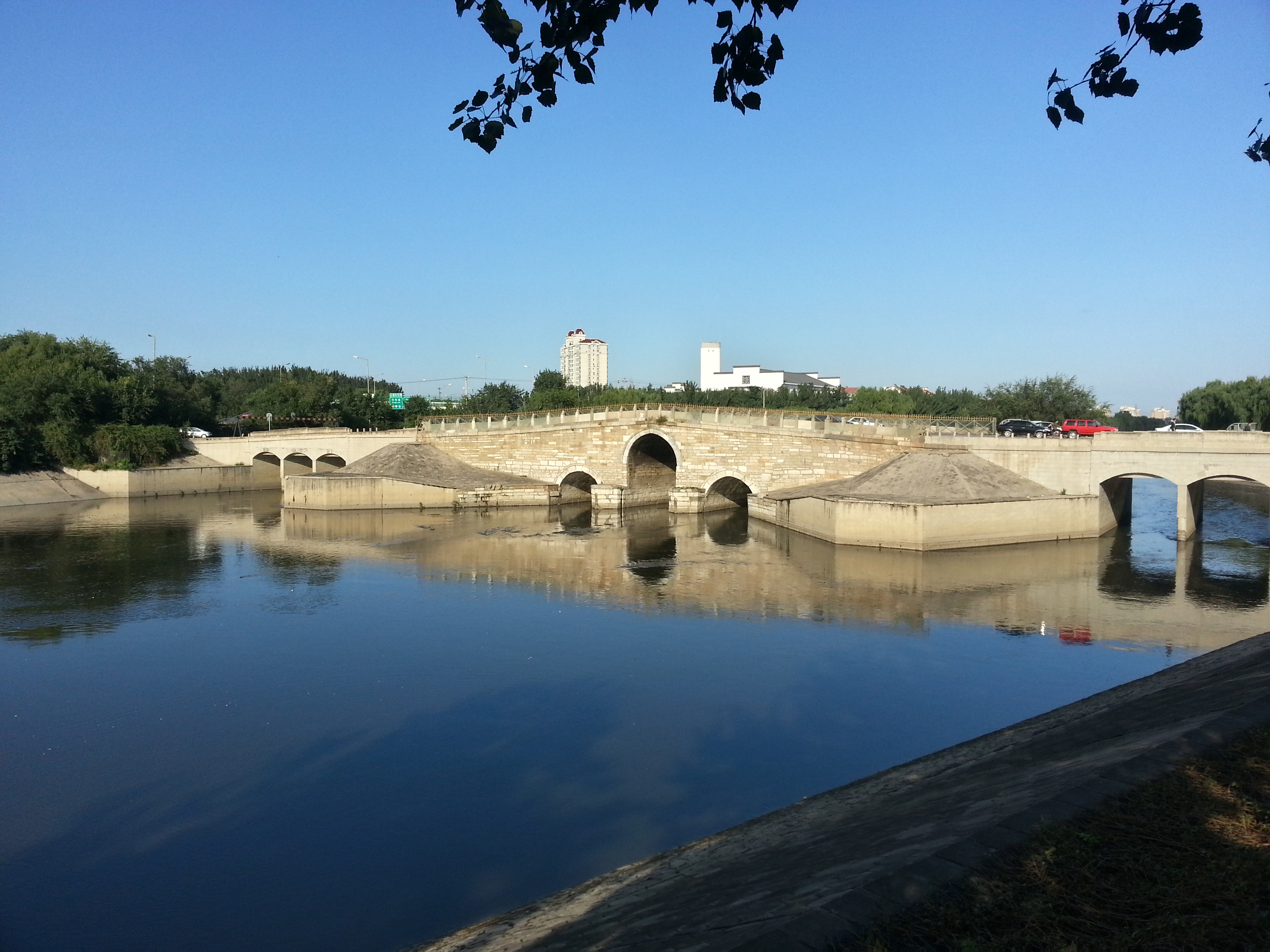
Baliqiao over the Tonghui section of the Grand Canal in Tongzhou District

The inclusion of the Jinshui and Gaoliang rivers gave Dadu a larger supply of water than the Lotus Pool which had nourished Ji, Youzhou, and Nanjing for the previous 2,000 years. To boost water supply even more, Yuan hydrologist Guo Shoujing built channels to draw additional spring water from Yuquan Mountain in the northwest through what is today the Kunming Lake of the Summer Palace through the Purple Bamboo Park to Jishuitan, which was a large reservoir inside Dadu. The expansion and extension of the Grand Canal from Dadu to Hangzhou enabled the city to import greater volumes of grain to sustain a larger population. The completion of the Tonghui Canal in 1293 allowed barges from Tongzhou to sail through the city right to the gates of the imperial palace at Shichahai. In 1270, Dadu had a population of 418,000 and another 635,000 in the surrounding region. By 1327, the city had 952,000 residents with another 2.08 million in the surrounding region.

The city's residential districts were laid out in a checkerboard pattern divided by avenues 25 m in width and narrow alleyways, called hutongs, 6–7 m wide. One of the best surviving examples of such a district is Dongsi Subdistrict, which has 14 parallel hutongs, called the 14 tiao of Dongsi. The name hutong is unique to the Yuan-era city; in older neighborhoods that date to the Liao and Jin eras, narrow lanes are called jie or streets. Each of the large avenues had underground sewers which carried rain and refuse to the south of the city. The main markets were located in Dongsi, Xisi and along the north shore of Jishuitan.

As Kublai Khan had intended, the city was a showcase of the cosmopolitan Yuan Empire. A number of foreign travelers including Giovanni di Monte Corvino, Odoric of Pordenone, Marco Polo and Ibn Battuta left written accounts of visits to the city. Some of the most famous writers of the Yuan era including Ma Zhiyuan, Guan Hanqing and Wang Shifu, lived in Dadu. The Mongols commissioned the building of an Islamic observatory and Islamic academy. The White Stupa Temple near Fuchengmen was commissioned by Kublai Khan in 1271. Its famous white stupa was designed by Nepali architect Araniko, and remains one of the biggest stupas in China. The Confucius Temple and Guozijian (Imperial Academy) were founded during the reign of Temür Khan, Emperor Chengzong, Kublai's successor.

Yuan rule was severely weakened by a succession struggle in 1328 known as the War of the Two Capitals in which the Dadu-based claimant to the throne prevailed over his Shangdu-based rival, but not after heavy fighting around Dadu and across the country among Mongol princes.

== Ming dynasty ==
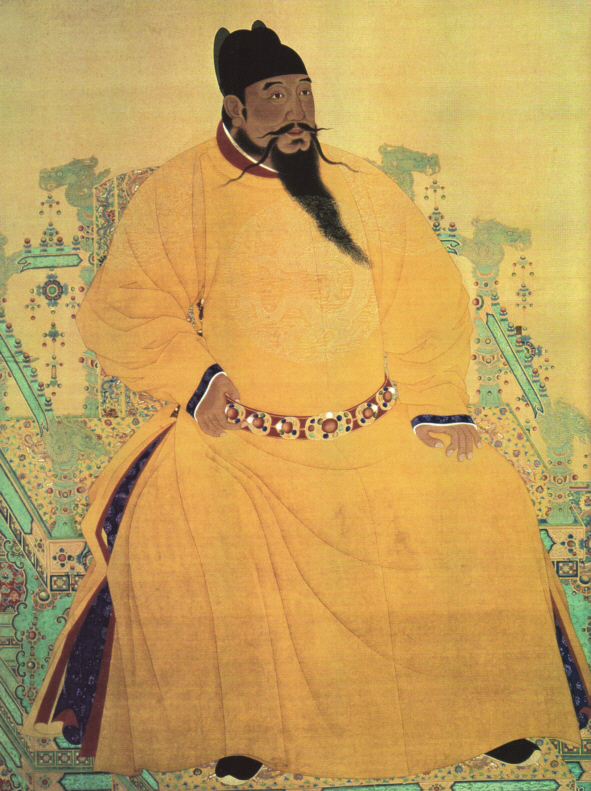
The Yongle Emperor moved the capital of the Ming dynasty from Nanjing to Beijing in 1421. He commissioned the Forbidden City, which was built from 1406 to 1420.

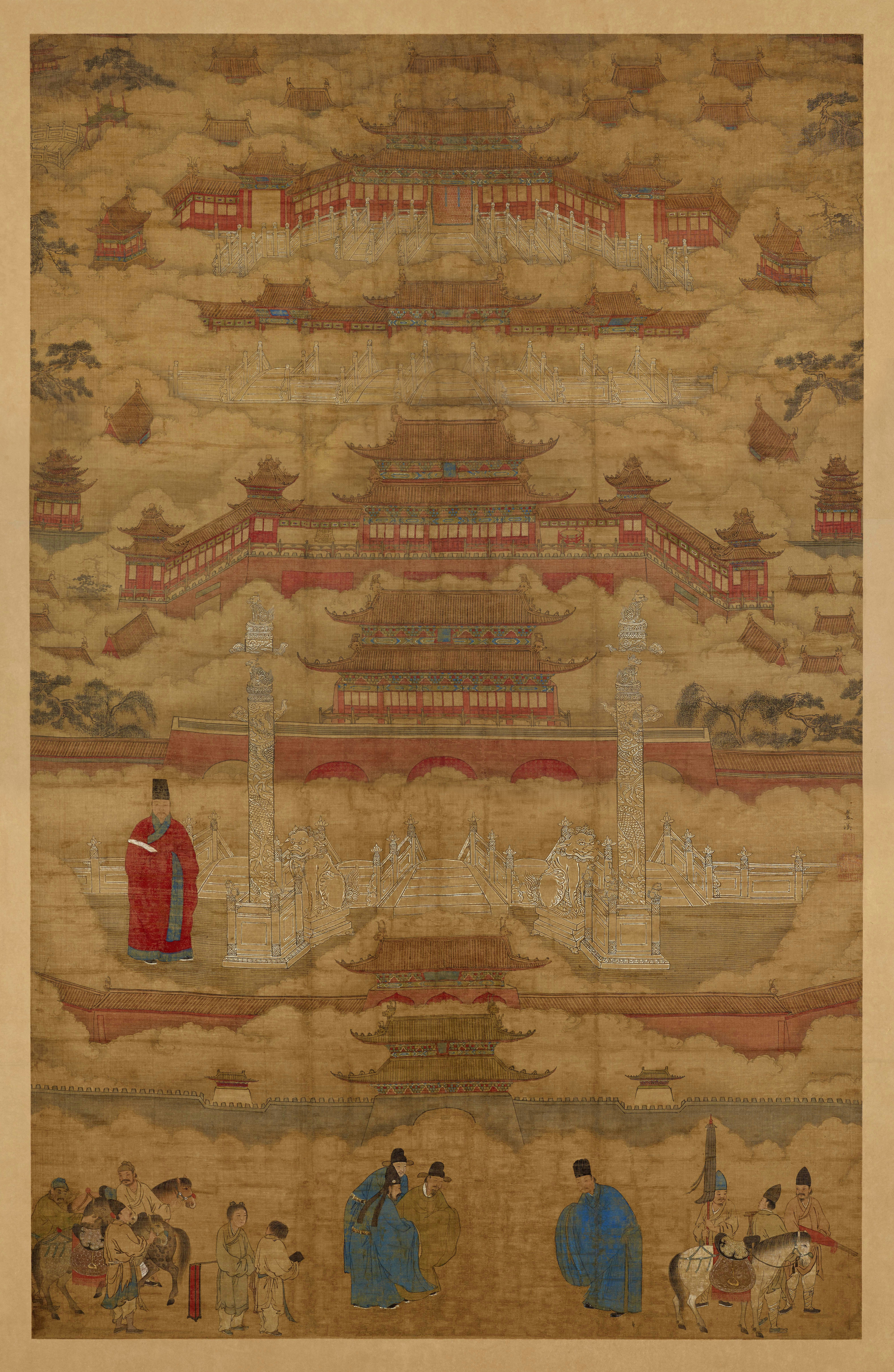
The Beijing Palace City Scroll, depicting the Forbidden City, 15th century.

In 1368, Zhu Yuanzhang founded the Ming dynasty in the Nanjing on the Yangtze River and his general Xu Da drove north and captured Dadu. The last Yuan emperor fled to the steppes. Dadu's imperial palace was razed and the city was renamed Beiping (北平 or "Northern Peace"). Nanjing, also known as Yingtian Fu became the Jingshi or the capital of the new dynasty. Two years later, Zhu Yuanzhang conferred Beiping to his fourth son, Zhu Di, who at the age of ten became the Prince of Yan. Zhu Di did not move to Beiping until 1380 but quickly built up his military power in defense of the northern frontier. His three older brothers all predeceased his father who died in 1398. The throne was passed on to Zhu Yunwen, the son of Zhu Di's oldest brother. The new emperor sought to curtail his uncle's power in Beiping, and a bitter power struggle ensued. In 1402, after a four-year civil war, Zhu Di seized Nanjing and declared himself the Yongle Emperor. As the third emperor of the Ming dynasty, he was not content to stay in Nanjing. He executed hundreds in Nanjing for remaining loyal to his predecessor, who was reportedly killed in a palace fire but was rumored to have escaped. The Yongle Emperor sent his eunuch Zheng He on the famed voyages overseas in part to investigate the rumors of the Jianwen Emperor abroad.

In 1403, the Yongle Emperor renamed his home base Beijing (北京, the "Northern Capital"), and elevated the city to the status of capital, on par with Nanjing. For the first time, Beijing took on its modern name, while the prefecture around the city gained the new name Shuntian Fu (顺天府). From 1403 to 1420, Yongle prepared his new capital with a massive reconstruction program. Some of Beijing's most iconic historical buildings, including the Forbidden City and the Temple of Heaven, were built for Yongle's capital. The Temples of the Sun, Earth and Moon were later added by the Daoist Jiajing Emperor in 1530.

In 1421, Yongle moved the Jingshi of the Ming to Beijing, which made Beijing the main capital of the Ming dynasty. From Beijing, Yongle launched multiple campaigns against the Mongols. After he died in 1424, his son, the Hongxi Emperor, ordered the capital be moved back to Nanjing, but died of illness in 1425. The Hongxi Emperor sent his son, the future Xuande Emperor, to Nanjing to prepare for the move, but the latter chose to keep the capital in Beijing after his accession to the throne. Like his grandfather, the Xuande Emperor was interested in monitoring affairs on the northern frontier. Most of the Great Wall in northern Beijing Municipality were built during the Ming dynasty.

Plan of Beijing showing the Forbidden City inside the Imperial City, as well as the Inner and Outer Cities.

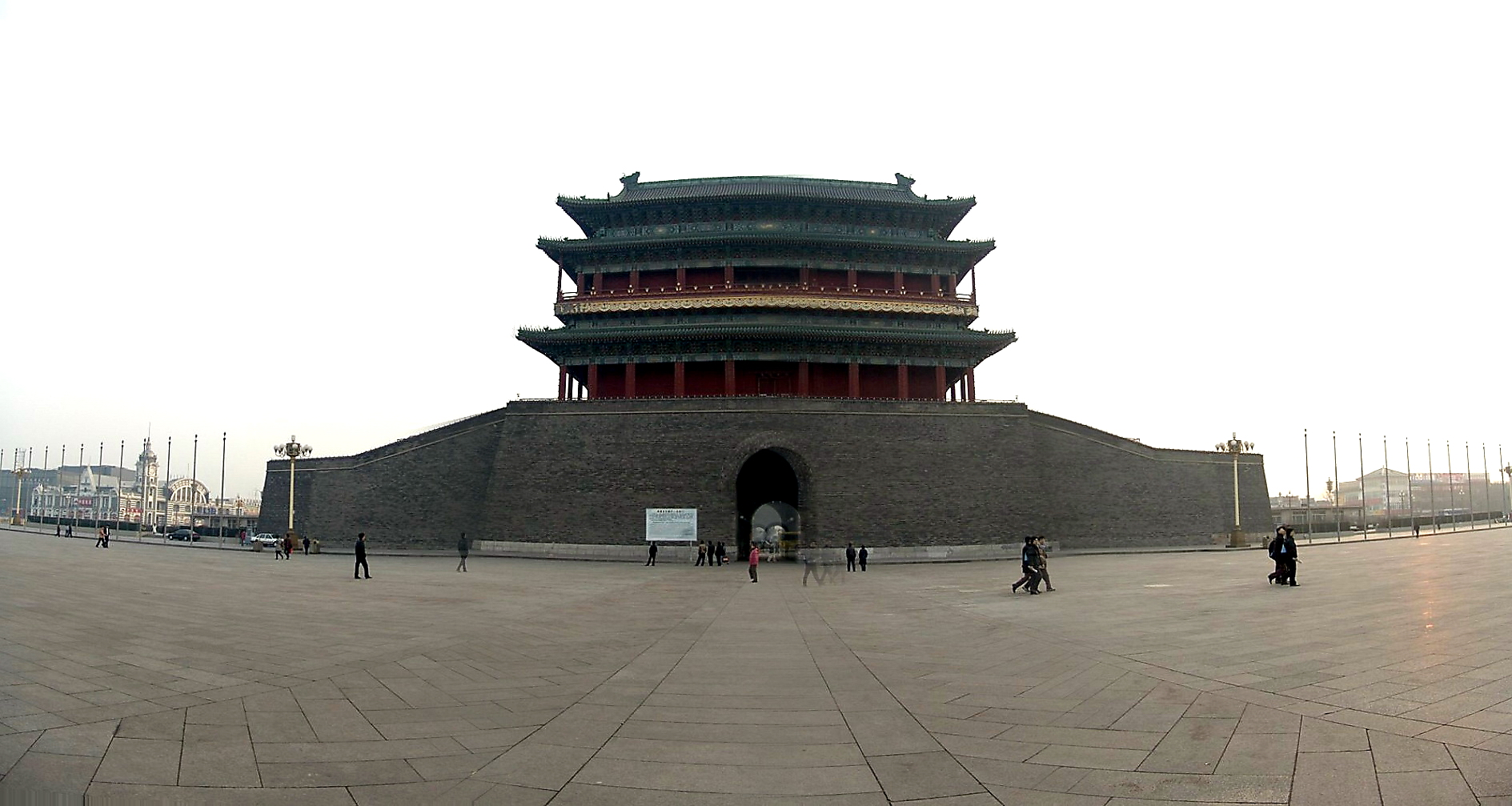
Much of the Ming city walls were torn down in the 1960s. The Zhengyang Gate (Qianmen) and its iconic archery tower is one of the few sections remaining.

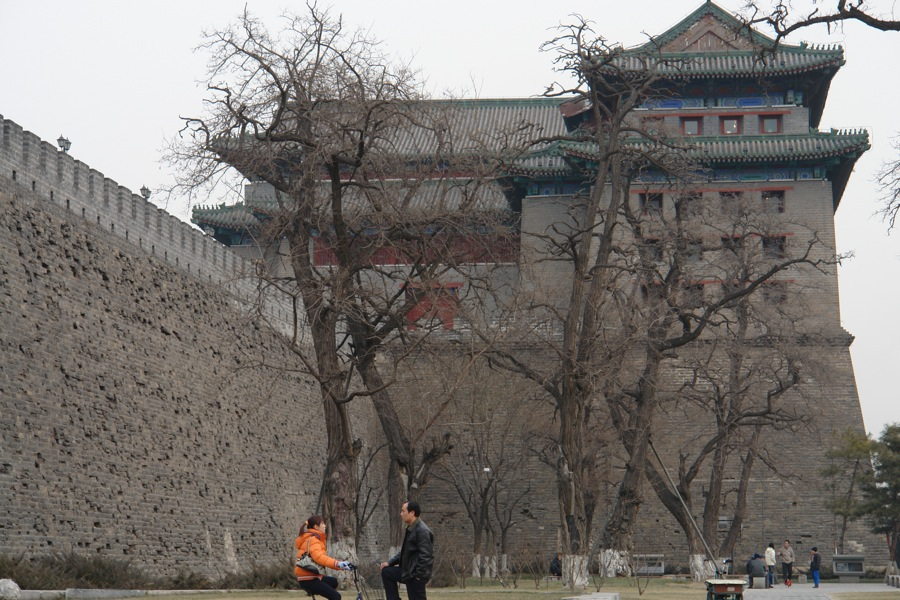
The Ming city wall's Southeast Corner Tower near Dongbianmen.

UNESCO World Heritage Sites of Beijing

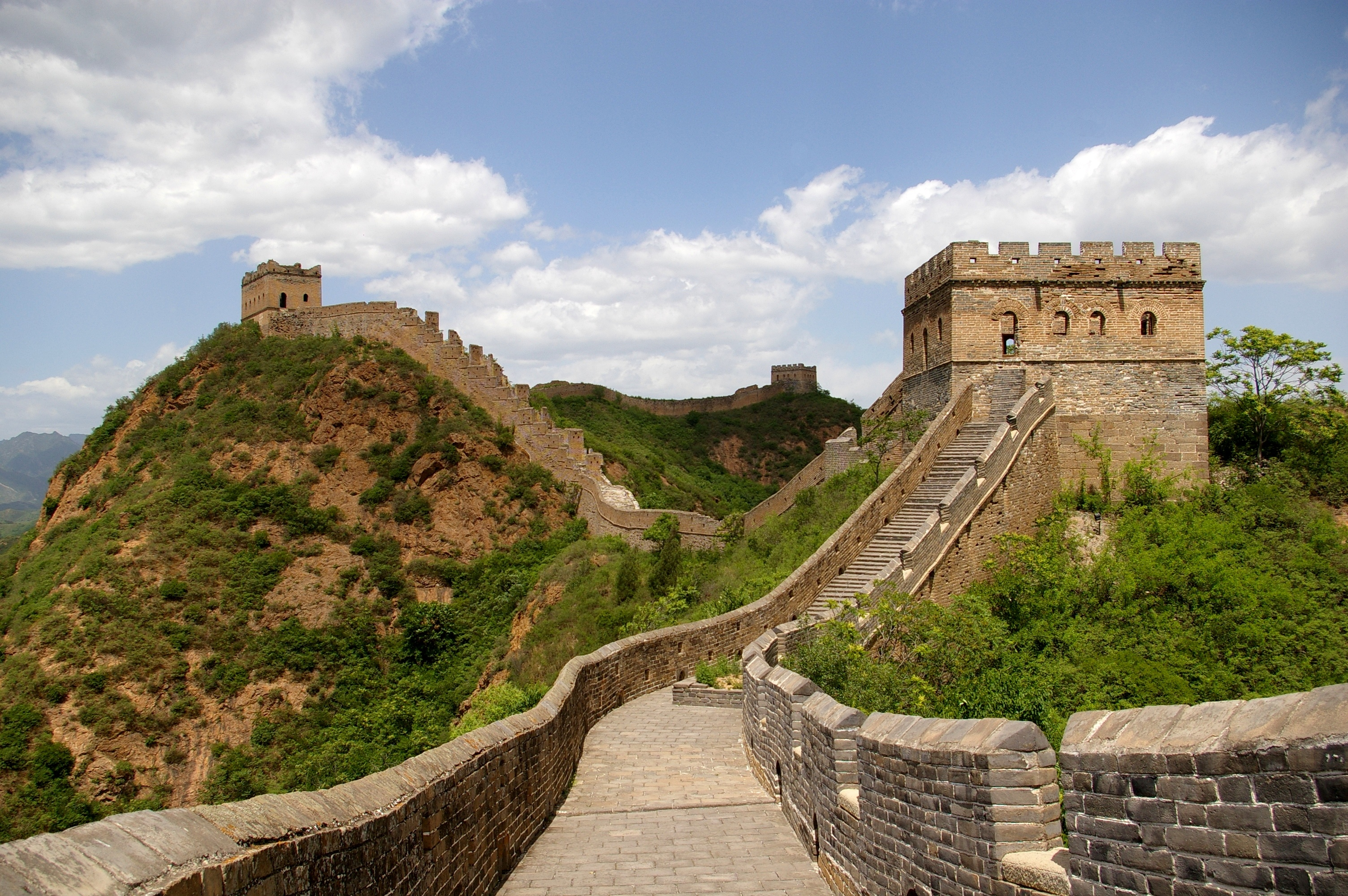
Great Wall of China

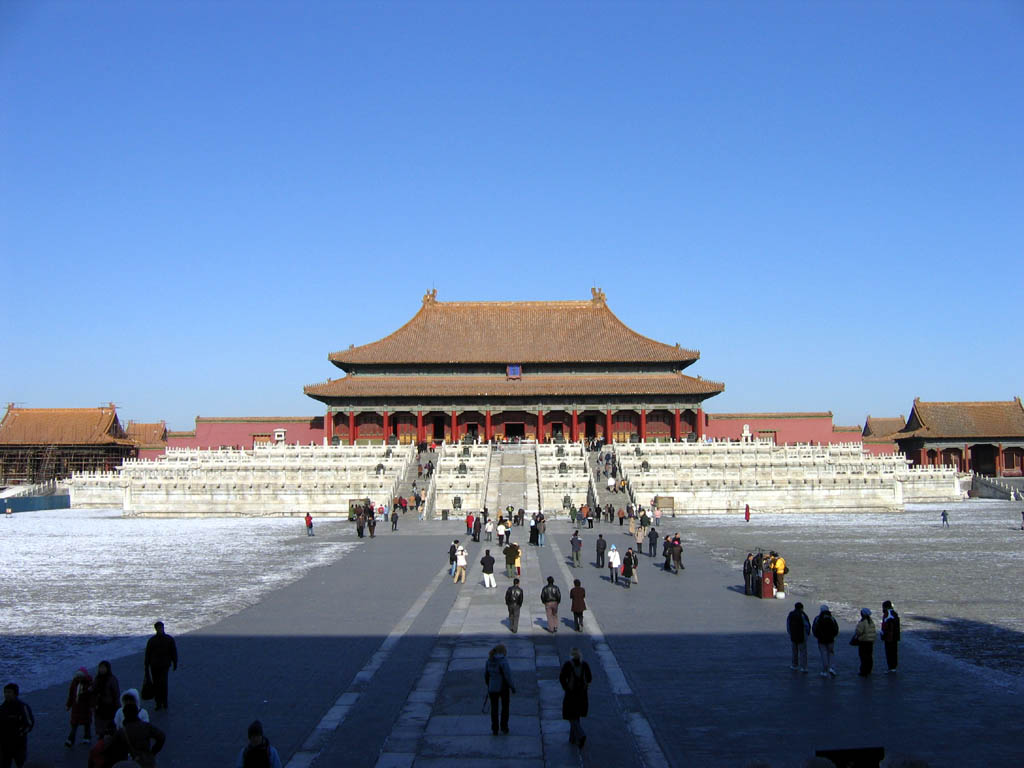
The Hall of Supreme Harmony of the Forbidden City

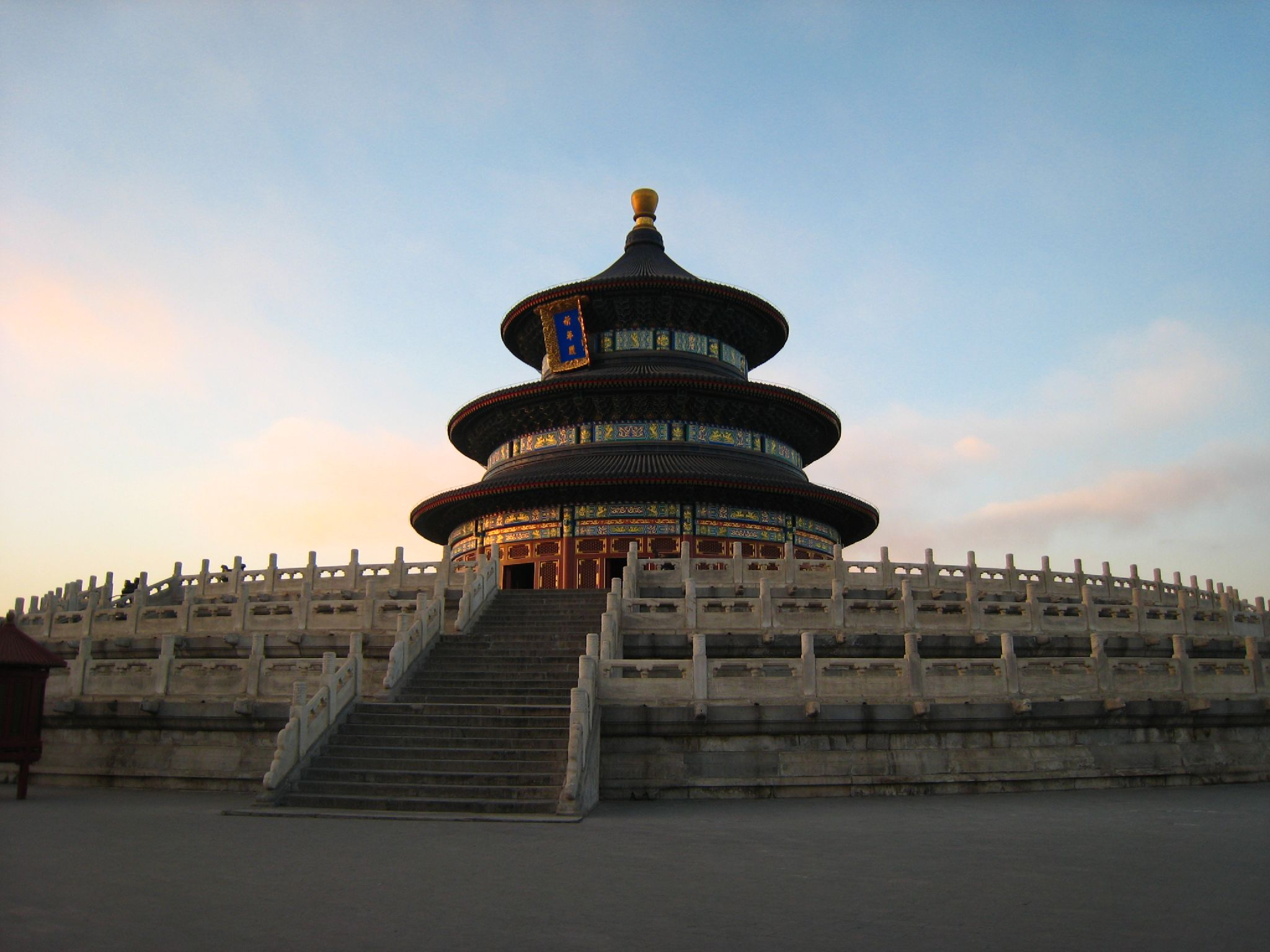
Temple of Heaven

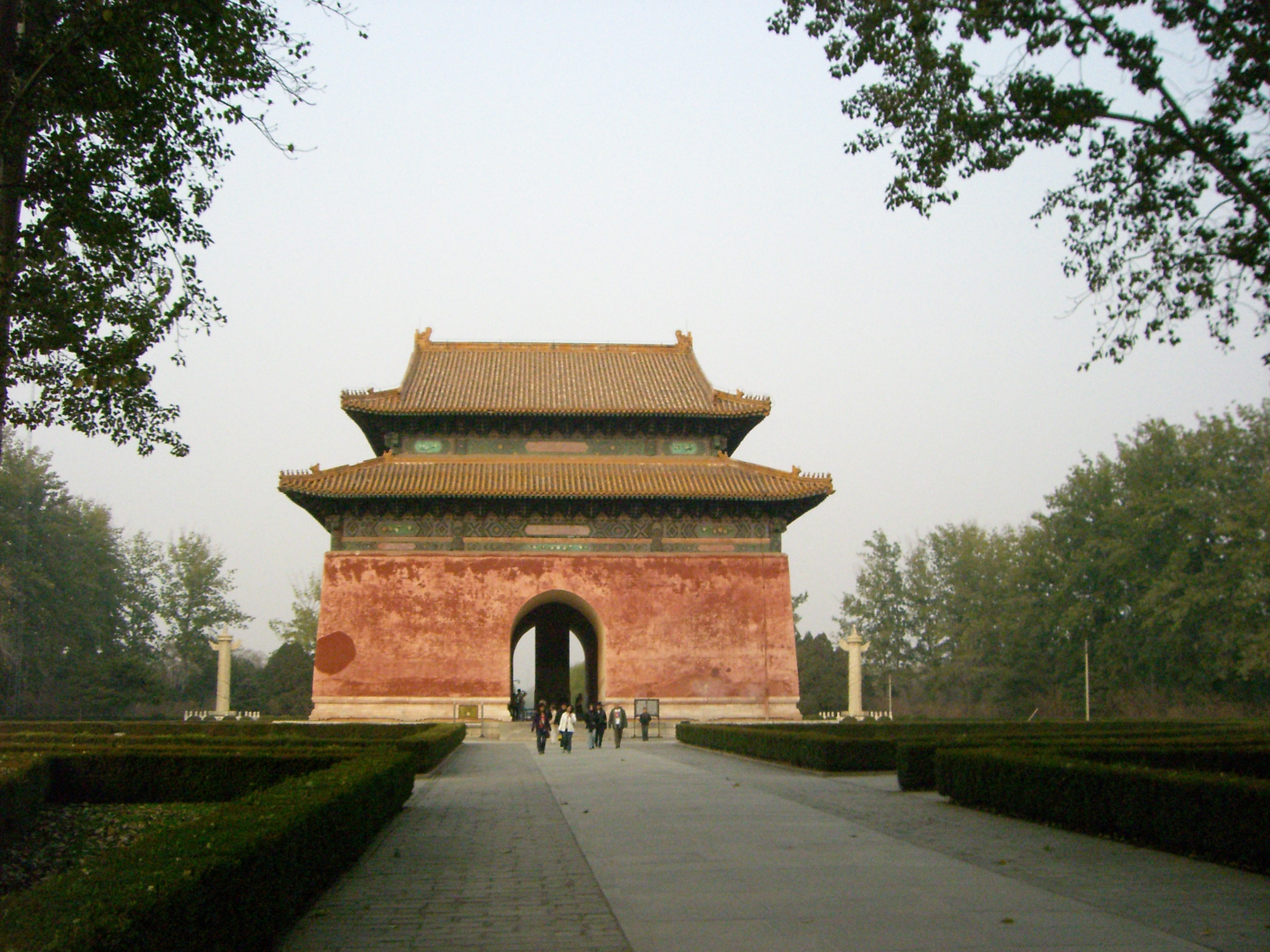
Ming Tombs

In the early Ming dynasty, the northern part of old Dadu was depopulated and abandoned. In 1369, the city's population had been reduced to 95,000, with only 113,000 in the surrounding region. A new northern wall was built 2.5 km (1.6 mi) to the south of the old wall, leaving the Jishuitan reservoir outside the city as part of the northern moat. A new southern wall for the city was built half a kilometer south of the southern Dadu wall. These changes completed the Inner City wall of Beijing, which had nine gates (three in the south and two each to the north, east and west).

The Inner City walls withstood a major test following the Tumu Crisis of 1449 when the Zhengtong Emperor was captured by Oirat Mongols during a military campaign near Huailai. The Oirat chieftain, Esen Tayisi, then drove through the Great Wall and marched on the Ming capital with the captive emperor in hand. Defense Minister Yu Qian rejected Esen's demands for ransom despite the Zhengtong Emperor's pleadings. Yu said the responsibility to protect the country took precedence over the Emperor's life. He rejected calls by other officials to move the capital to the South and instead elevated the Zhengtong Emperor's younger half-brother to the throne and assembled 220,000 troops to defend the city. Ming forces with firearms and cannons ambushed the Mongol cavalry outside Deshengmen, killing Esen's brother in the barrage, and repelled another attack on Xizhimen. Esen retreated to Mongolia and three years later, returned the captive Zhengtong Emperor with no ransom paid. In 1457, the Zhengtong Emperor reclaimed the throne and had Yu Qian executed for treason. Yu Qian's home near Dongdan was later made into a temple in his honor.

Back in power, the Zhengtong Emperor, now ruling under the new era name of Tianshun, first promoted and then became distrustful of officials who had aided his restoration. One of them, the grand eunuch Cao Jixiang, decided to strike at the throne. In August 1461, Cao's adopted son, Cao Qin, launched a mutiny among ethnic Mongol troops stationed inside Beijing. The plot was betrayed and the Tianshun Emperor ordered the gates of the Forbidden City and the Inner City closed, trapping the mutineers, who were unable to break into the palace complex and were killed.

In 1550, Altan Khan led a Khalkha Mongol raid on Beijing that pillaged the northern suburbs but did not attempt to take the city. To protect the city's southern suburbs, including neighborhoods from the Liao and Jin-eras and the Temple of Heaven, the Outer City wall was built in 1553. The Outer City wall had seven gates, three to the south, two each to the east and west. The Inner and Outer Ming city walls stood until in the 1960s when all but a couple small sections were pulled down to build the Beijing Subway and the 2nd Ring Road. The largest and best-preserved section of the wall is located in the Ming City Wall Relics Park near the southeast corner of the inner city.

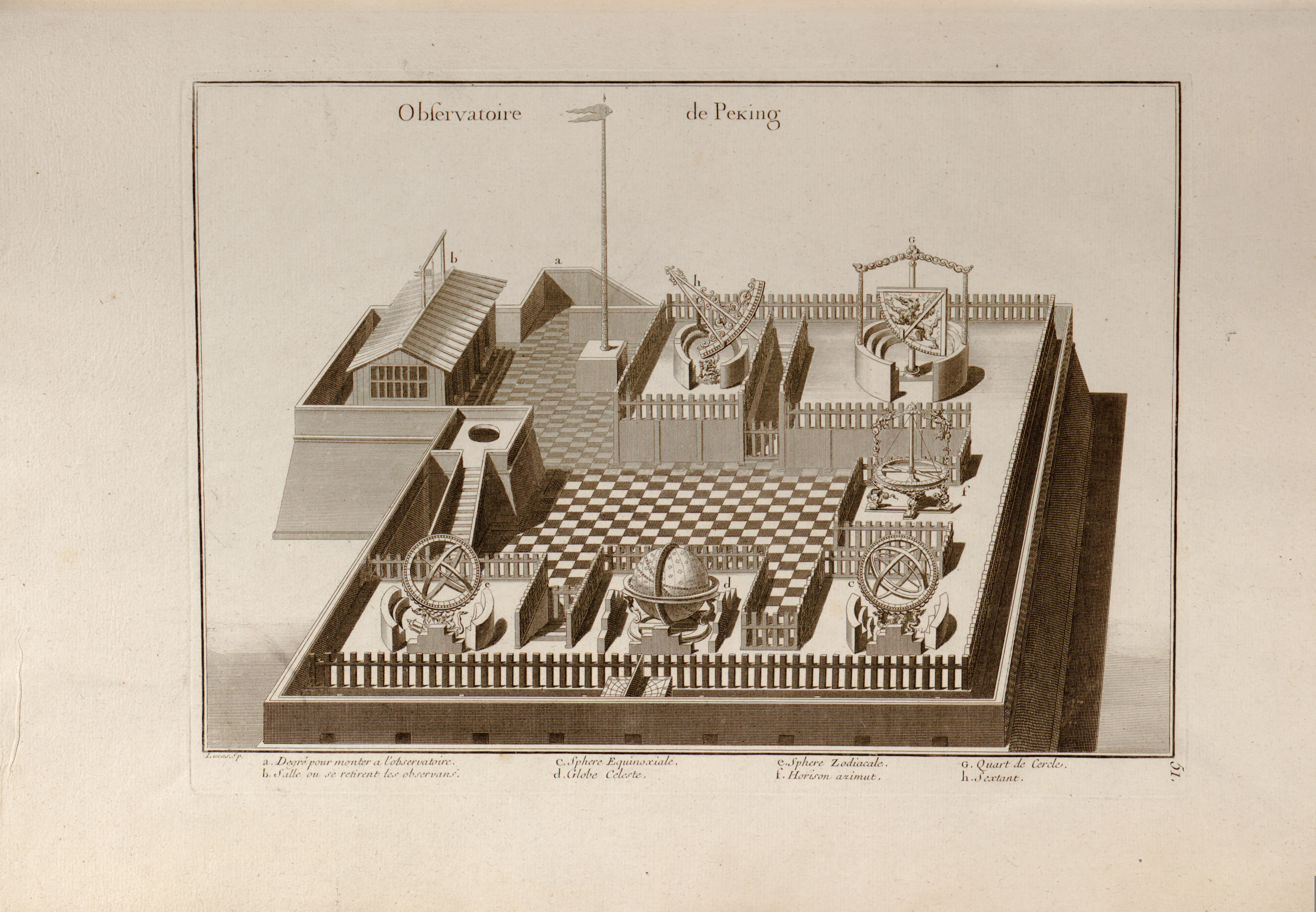
Beijing's Ancient Observatory, established in 1442, as depicted by Jean Baptiste Bourguignon d'Anville in 1737. In the Qing dynasty, Jesuit directors of the observatory, Johann Adam Schall von Bell and Ferdinand Verbiest, built many of the instruments.

Jesuit missions reached Beijing at the turn of the 16th century. In 1601, Matteo Ricci became an advisor to the imperial court of the Wanli Emperor and became the first Westerner to have access to the Forbidden City. He established the Nantang Cathedral in 1605, the oldest surviving Catholic church in the city. Other Jesuits later became directors of Beijing's Imperial Observatory.

On the eve of the Tumu Crisis in 1448, the city had 960,000 residents with another 2.19 million living in the surrounding region. Beijing was the largest city in the world from 1425 to 1635 and from 1710 to 1825. To feed the growing population, Ming authorities built and administered granaries, including the Imperial Granary and Jingtong storehouses near the terminus of the Grand Canal, which fed a growing population and sustained the military. The granaries helped control prices and prevent inflation, but price controls became less effective as the population grew and demand for food exceeded supply.

Until the mid-15th century, Beijing residents relied on wood for heating and cooking. The growing population led to massive logging of the forests around the city. By the mid-15th century, the forests had largely disappeared. As a substitute, residents turned to coal, which was first mined in the Western Hills during the Yuan dynasty and expanded in the Ming. The use of coal caused many environmental problems and changed the ecological system around the city.

During the Ming dynasty, 15 epidemic outbreaks occurred in the city of Beijing including smallpox, "pimple plague" and "vomit blood plague" - the latter two were possibly bubonic plague and pneumonic plague. In most cases, the public health system functioned well in gaining control of the outbreaks, except in 1643. That year, epidemics claimed 200,000 lives in Beijing, thus compromising the defense of the city from the attacks of the peasant rebels and contributing to the downfall of the dynasty.

During the 15th and 16th centuries, banditry was common near Beijing despite the presence of imperial government. Due to inadequate supervision and economic privation, imperial troops in the capital region to protect the throne would often turn to brigandage. Officials responsible for eradicating banditry often had ties to brigands and other marginal elements of Ming society.

During the late Ming dynasty, Beijing faced threats from both within and beyond the Great Wall. In 1629, the Manchus, who were descendants of the Jurchens, raided Beijing from the Manchuria, but were defeated outside the outer city walls at Guangqumen and Zuoanmen by Ming commander Yuan Chonghuan. After retreating north, Manchu leader, Hong Taiji, through treachery, deceived the Ming dynasty's Chongzhen Emperor into believing that Yuan Chonghuan had actually betrayed the Ming. In 1630, the Chongzhen Emperor had Yuan executed in public at Caishikou through death by a thousand cuts. Yuan was rehabilitated 150 years later by the Qianlong Emperor of the Qing dynasty and his tomb near Guangqumen is now a shrine.

Also in 1629, Li Zicheng launched a peasant rebellion in northwest China and, after 15 years of conquest, captured Beijing in March 1644. The Chongzhen Emperor committed suicide by hanging himself from a tree in Jingshan. Li proclaimed himself emperor of the Shun dynasty, but he was defeated at Shanhaiguan by Ming general Wu Sangui and the Manchu Prince Dorgon. Wu had defected to the Manchus and allowed them inside the Great Wall. They drove Li Zicheng from Beijing in late April.

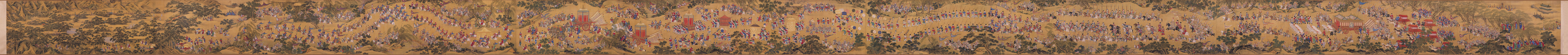
The panorama painting "Departure Herald", painted during the reign of the Jiajing Emperor (1521−1567 AD), shows the emperor traveling on horseback with a large escort through the countryside from Beijing's Imperial City to the Ming dynasty tombs. Beginning with Yongle, thirteen Ming emperors were buried in the Ming Tombs of present-day Changping District.

== Qing dynasty ==
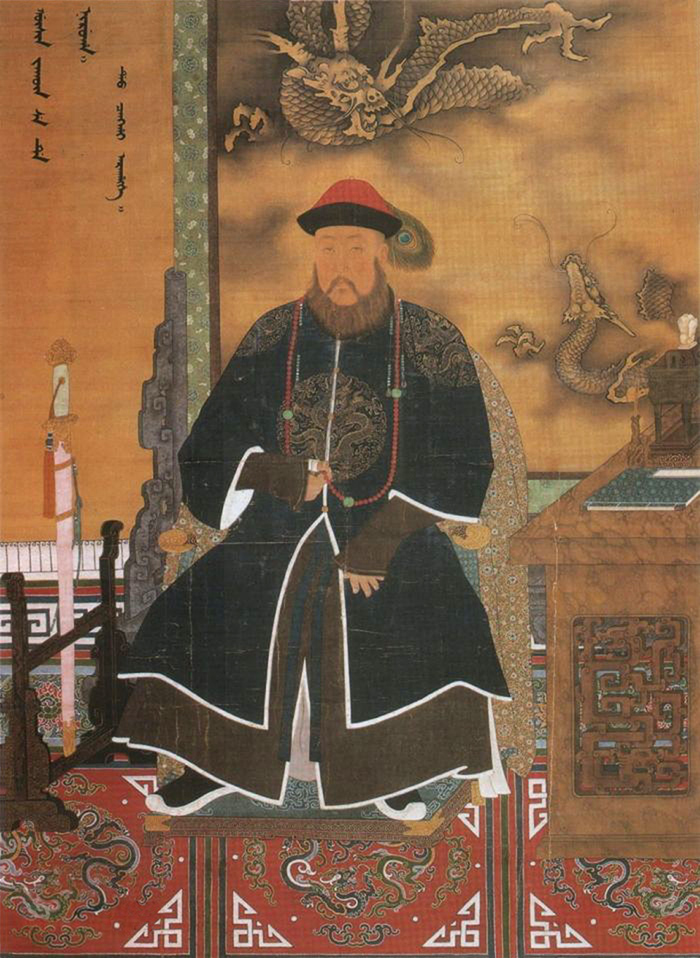
Prince regent Dorgon, who led the Manchus south of the Great Wall and seized Beijing in 1644.

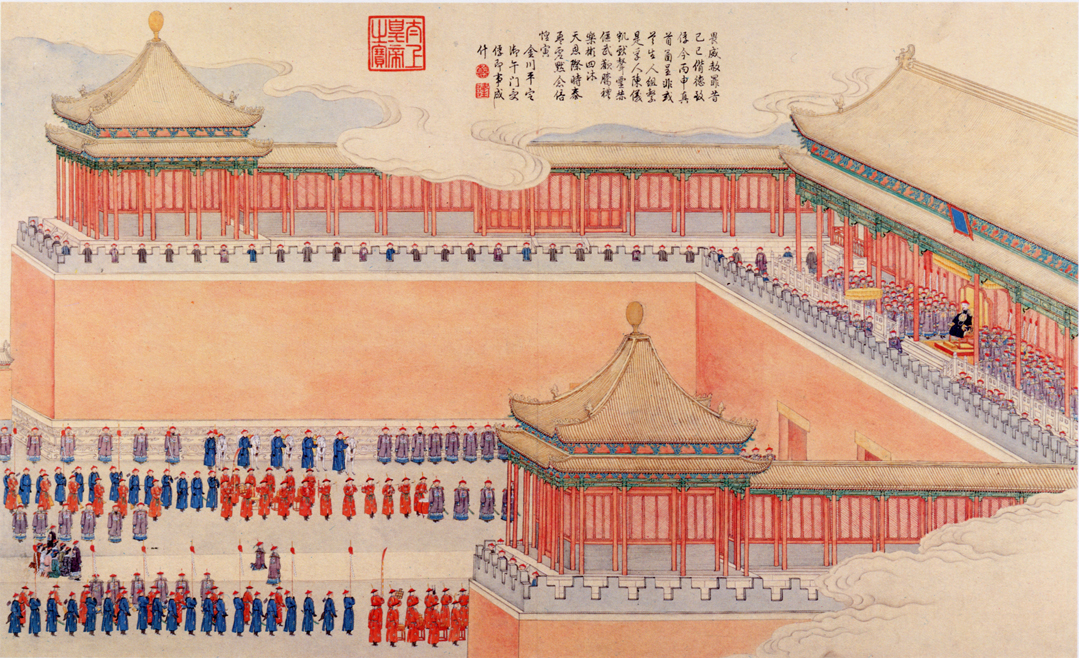
Dorgon preserved trappings of imperial power including the bureaucracy, rituals and palaces, and moved the Qing capital to Beijing. In so doing, he positioned the Qing as the political heir to the Ming and legitimate ruler of China. Above, Qing imperial procession at the Forbidden City depicted in an 18th-century Jesuit painting.

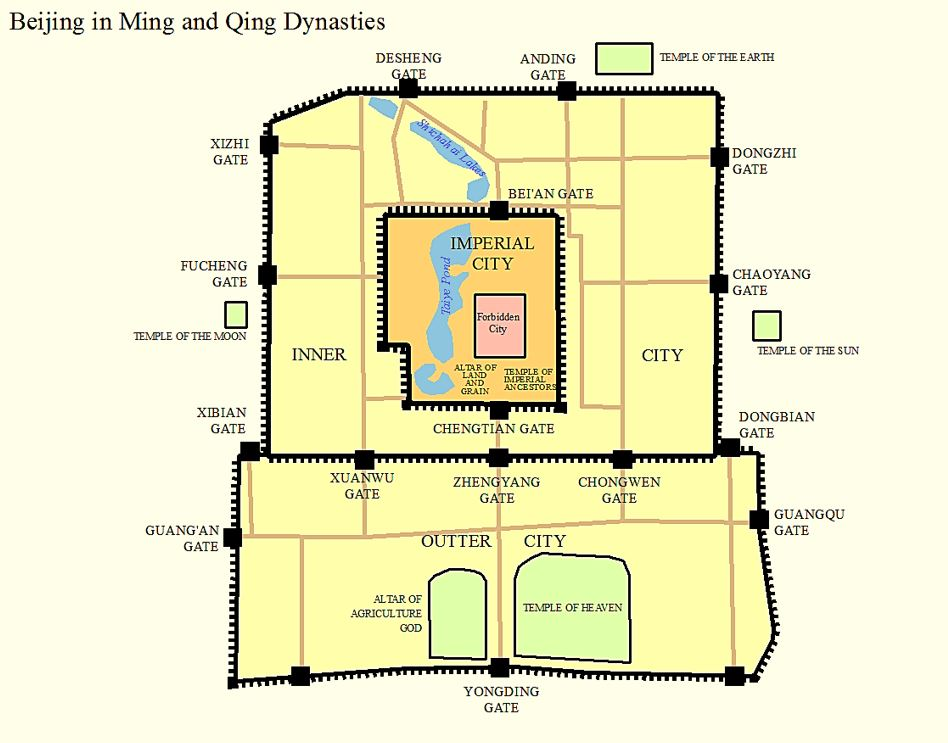
Map of Beijing in Qing Dynasty

On May 3, 1644, the Manchus seized Beijing in the name of freeing the city from the rebel forces of Li Zicheng. Dorgon held a state funeral for the Chongzhen Emperor of the Ming dynasty and reappointed many Ming officials. In October, he moved the child Shunzhi Emperor from the old capital Shenyang into the Forbidden City and made Beijing the new seat of the Qing dynasty. In the following decades, the Manchus would conquer the rest of the country and ruled China for nearly three centuries from the city. During this era, Beijing was also known as Jingshi which corresponds with the Manchu name Gemun Hecen. The city's population, which had fallen to 144,000 in 1644, rebounded to 539,000 in 1647 (the population of the surrounding area rose from 554,000 to 1.3 million).

The Qing largely retained the physical configuration of Beijing inside the city walls. Each of the Eight Banners, including the Manchu, Mongol, and Han Banners were assigned to guard and live near the eight gates of the Inner City. Outside the city, the Qing court seized large tracts of land for Manchu noble estates. Northwest of the city, Qing emperors built several large palatial gardens. In 1684, the Kangxi Emperor built the Changchun Garden on the site of the Ming dynasty's Qinghua (or Tsinghua) Garden (outside today's west gate of Peking University). In the early 18th century, he began building the Yuanmingyuan, also known as the "Old Summer Palace", which the Qianlong Emperor expanded with European Baroque-style garden pavilions. In 1750, the Qianlong Emperor built the Yiheyuan, commonly referred to as the "Summer Palace". The two summer palaces represent both the culmination of Qing imperial splendor and its decline. Both were ransacked and razed by invading Western powers in the late Qing dynasty.

The Beijing dialect eventually became the official national language for the country. In the early Qing dynasty, Han officials serving in the imperial court were required to learn the Manchu language, but most Manchus eventually learned to speak Chinese. The Manchus adopted Beijing Mandarin as their spoken language and this was a feature of Manchu Banner garrisons in areas of southern China. In 1728, the Yongzheng Emperor, who could not understand officials from southern China, decreed that all takers of the civil service examination must be able to speak Beijing Mandarin. Though the decree was eventually lifted under the Jiaqing Emperor, the Beijing dialect spread first among officials and then among commoners under subsequent regimes. Shortly after the founding of the Republic of China, the Commission on the Unification of Pronunciation made the Beijing dialect the national standard for spoken Chinese in 1913. After the capital was moved to Nanjing, National Languages Committee reaffirmed the Beijing dialect as the standard in 1932. The People's Republic of China followed suit in 1955.

UNESCO World Heritage Site of Beijing

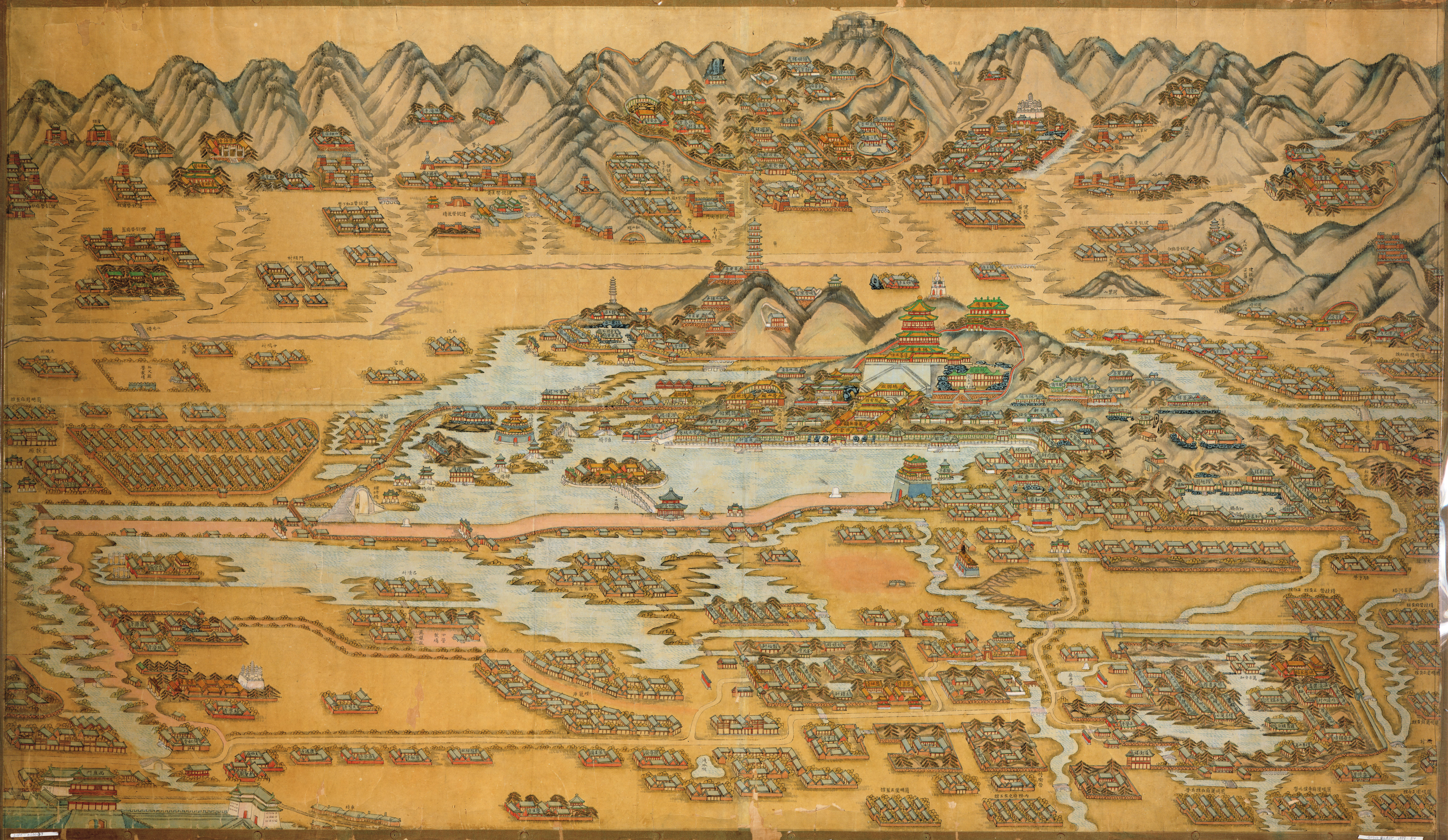
1888 water color pictorial map of the Summer Palace

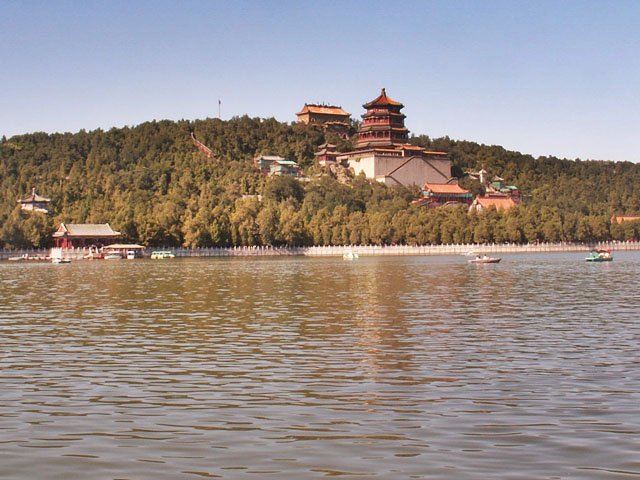
Longevity Hill and Kunming Lake

The Qing dynasty maintained a relatively stable supply of food for the population of the capital during the late 17th and early 18th centuries. The government's grain tribute system brought food from the provinces and kept grain prices stable. Soup kitchens provided relief to the needy. The secure food supply helped the Qing court maintain a degree of political stability. Temple fairs such as the Huguo Fair, which are like monthly bazaars held around temples, added to the commercial vibrance of the city. At the height of the Qianlong Emperor's reign in 1781, the city had a population of 776,242 (and another 2.18 million in the surrounding region). Thereafter, Qing authorities began to restrict inward migration to the city. A century later, the census of 1881–82 showed similar figures of 776,111 and 2.45 million.

In 1790, the Qing court's Nanfu office, which was in charge of organizing entertainment for the emperor, invited the dramatic opera troupes from Anhui to perform for the Qianlong Emperor. Under the Qianlong Emperor, the Nanfu had up to a thousand employees, including actors, musicians, and court eunuchs. In 1827, the Daoguang Emperor, the Qianlong Emperor's grandson, changed the name from Nanfu to Shengpingshu, and reduced the number of performances. Nevertheless, the court invited opera troupes from Hubei came to perform. The Anhui and Hubei operatic styles eventually blended together in the mid-19th century to form Peking Opera.

Most of Beijing's oldest business establishments date to the Qing era. Tongrentang, opened in 1669 by a royal physician, became the sole supplier of herbal medicine to the Qing court in 1723. Baikui Laohao, the Hui Muslim restaurant serving traditional Beijing cuisine, opened its first store next to the Longfu Temple in 1780. Roast duck was part of the imperial menu dating back to the Yuan dynasty and restaurants serving Anas peking to the public opened in the 15th century, but it was Quanjude, which opened in 1864 and introduced the "hung oven", that made Peking Duck world-famous.

In 1813, some 200 adherents of the White Lotus sect launched a surprise siege on the Forbidden City but were repelled. In response, authorities imposed the baojia system of social surveillance and control.

The British diplomat Lord Macartney's mission to China arrived in Beijing in 1792, but failed to persuade the Qianlong Emperor to ease trade restrictions or to permit a permanent British Embassy in the city. Nevertheless, Macartney observed weaknesses within the Qing regime, which would influence future Sino-British conflicts.

The Second Opium War
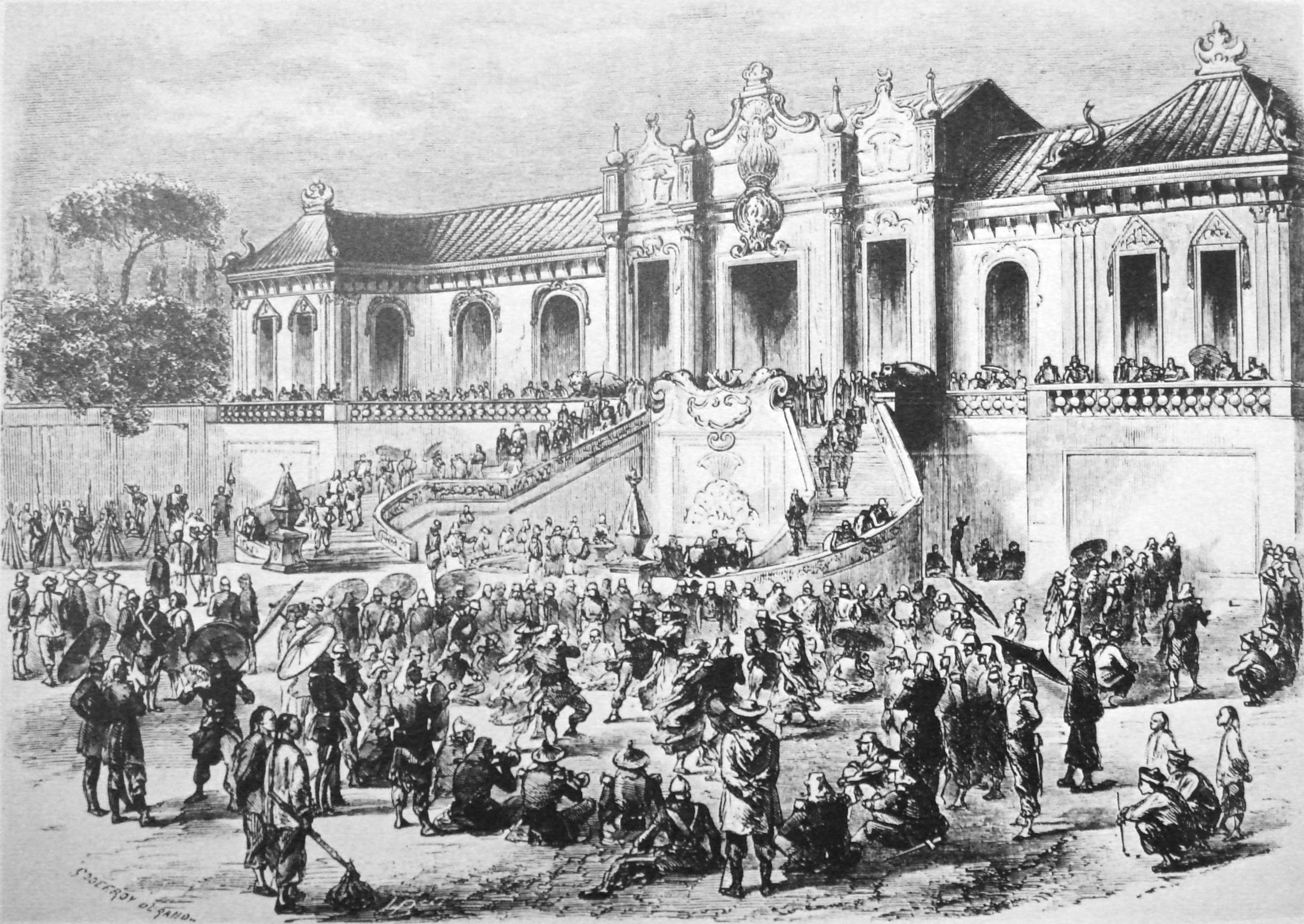
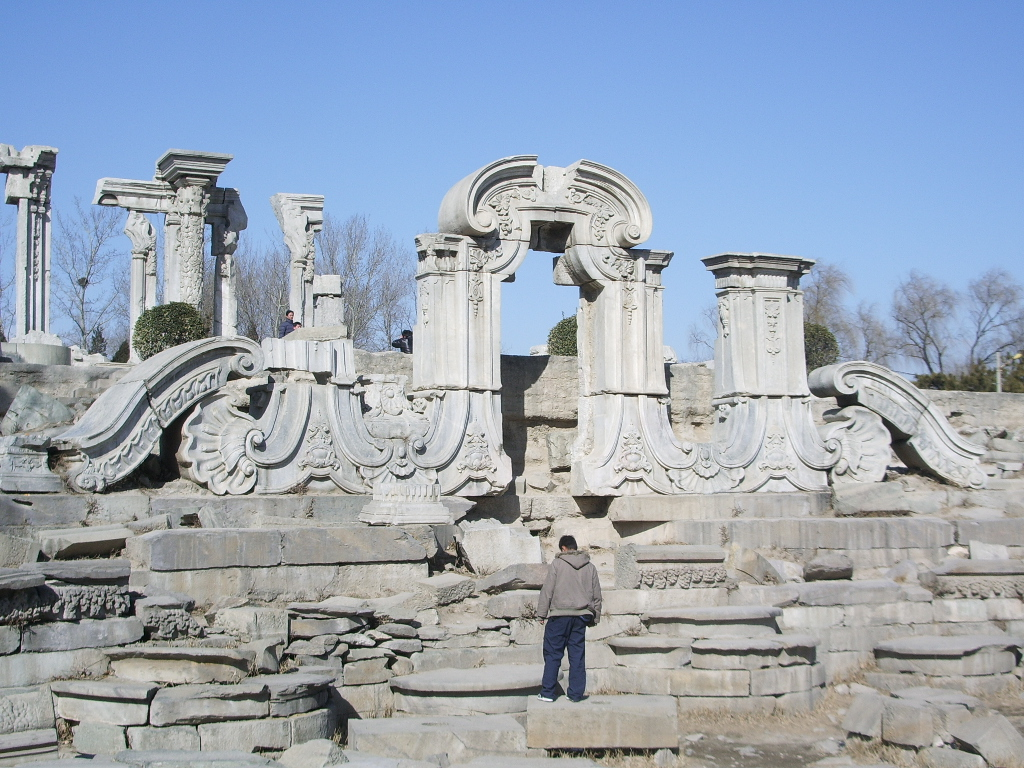
Left:Illustration by Godefroy Durand on December 22, 1860, depicting the sacking of a Baroque-style hall in the Old Summer Palace during the Second Opium War. Right: The ruins of the Old Summer Palace
The Boxer Rebellion
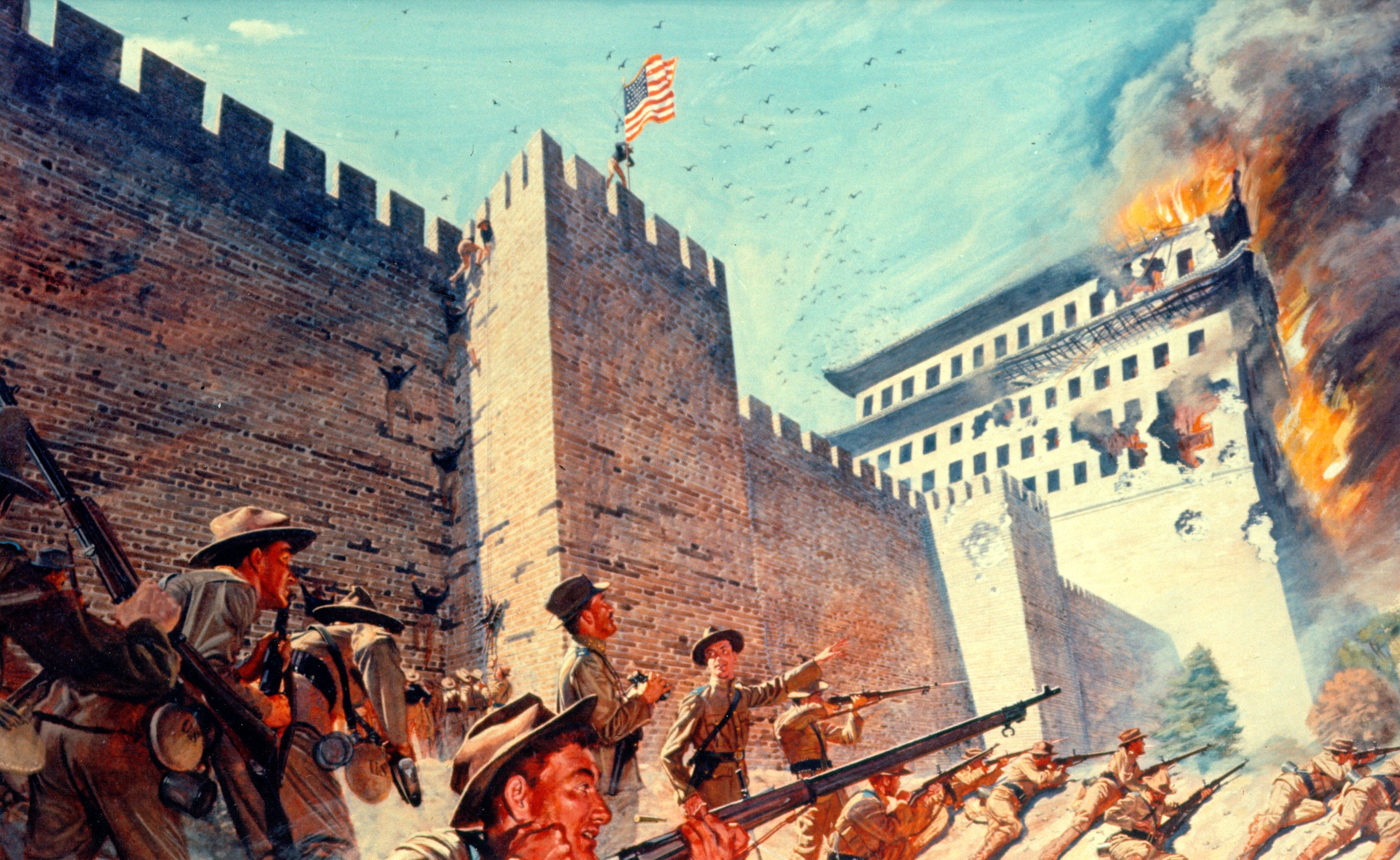
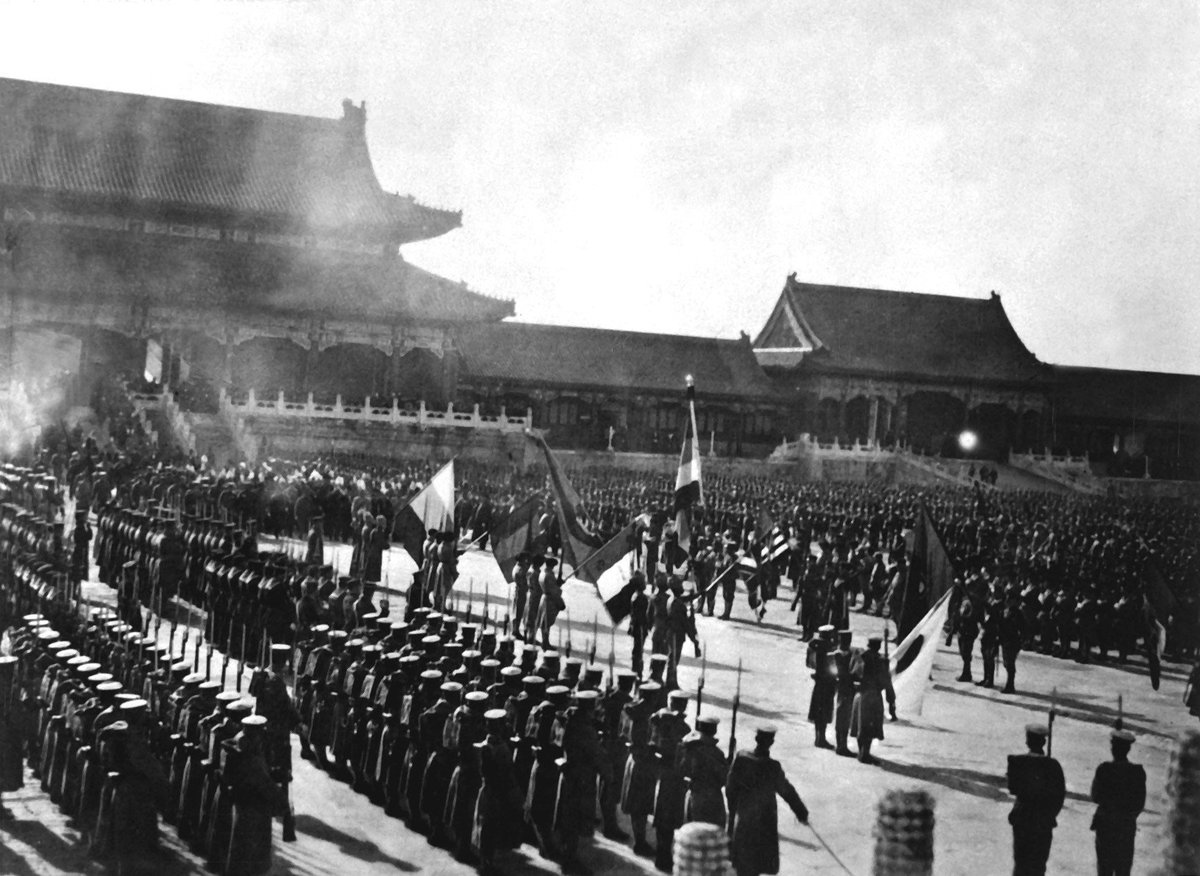
Left: U.S. Army depiction of the assault on Beijing's Southeast Corner Tower near Dongbianmen on August 14, 1900. Right: Foreign armies of the Eight-Nation Alliance assemble inside the Forbidden City after capturing Beijing.

In 1860, during the Second Opium War, Anglo-French expeditionary forces defeated a Qing army at Baliqiao east of Beijing. They captured the city and sacked the Summer Palace and Old Summer Palace. Lord Elgin, the commander of the expedition, ordered the burning of the Old Summer Palace in retaliation of Qing mistreatment of Western prisoners. He spared the Forbidden City, saving it as a venue for the treaty-signing ceremony. Under the Convention of Peking that ended the war, the Qing government was forced to allow Western powers to establish permanent diplomatic presence in the city. The foreign embassies were based southeast of the Forbidden City in the Beijing Legation Quarter.

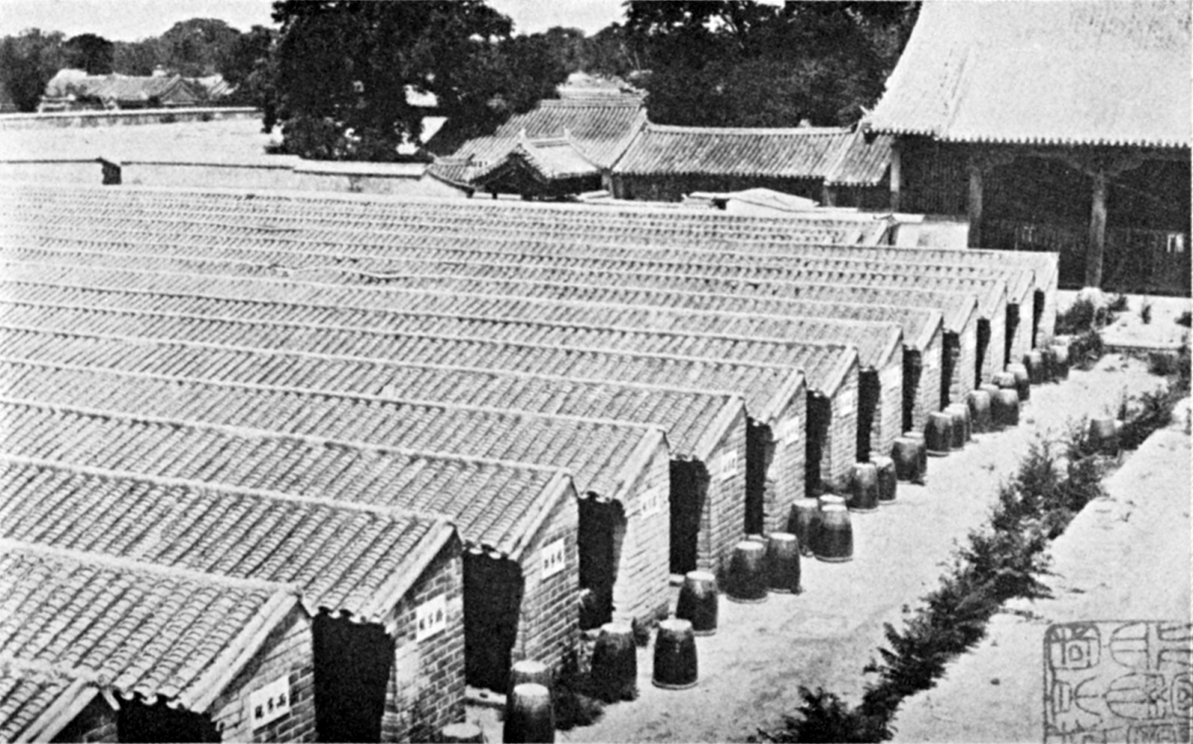
The Imperial Examination Hall (Gongyuan) in 1909. For centuries, students flocked to the capital each year to take the imperial examination, and spent days in densely packed cubicles. Highest scorers received degrees and government positions. The exams were abolished in 1905 as part of the education reforms.

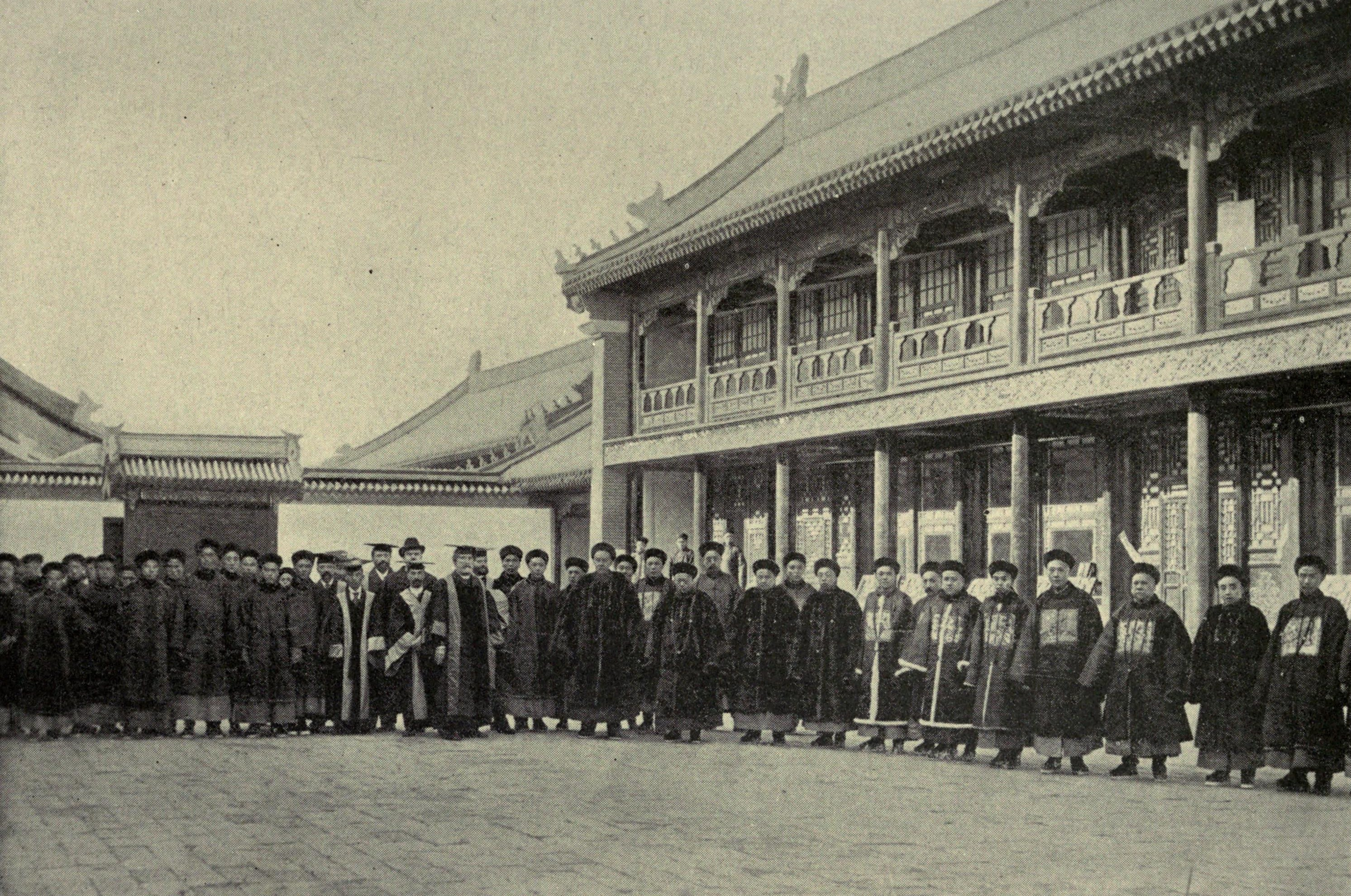
Faculty of the Imperial University of Peking, the institutional predecessor of Peking University.

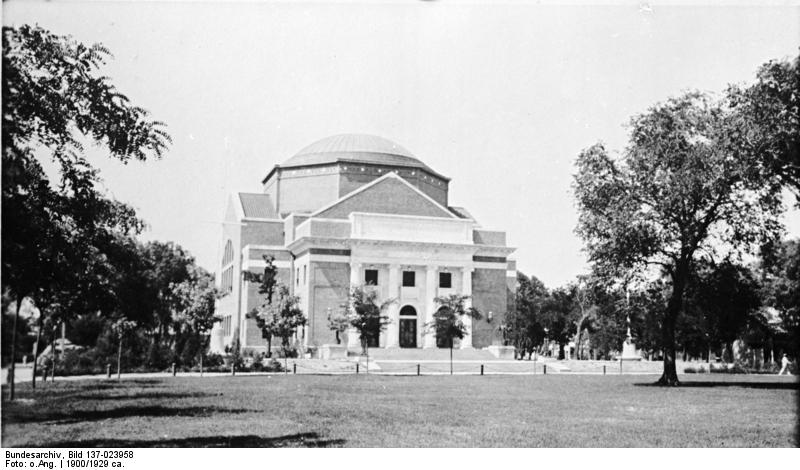
Grand Auditorium of Tsinghua University, established by the Boxer Indemnity Scholar Program.

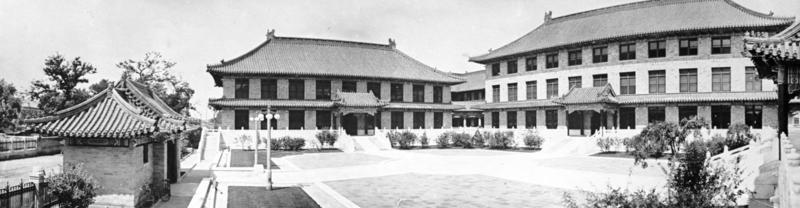
The Peking Union Medical College, founded in 1906 by the American and British missionaries, remains one of China's top medical schools.

In 1886, Empress Dowager Cixi had the Summer Palace rebuilt using funds originally designated for the imperial navy, the Beiyang Fleet. After the Qing government was defeated by Japan in the First Sino-Japanese War and forced to sign the humiliating Treaty of Shimonoseki, Kang Youwei assembled 1,300 scholars outside Xuanwumen to protest the treaty and drafted a 10,000-character appeal to the Guangxu Emperor. In June 1898, the Guangxu Emperor adopted the proposals of Kang Youwei, Liang Qichao and other scholars and launched the Hundred Days' Reform. The reforms alarmed Empress Dowager Cixi, who, with the help of Ronglu and Beiyang military commander Yuan Shikai, launched a coup. The Guangxu Emperor was imprisoned, Kang and Liang fled abroad, and Tan Sitong and five other scholar reformers were publicly beheaded at Caishikou outside Xuanwumen. One legacy of the short-lived reform era was the founding of Peking University in 1898. The university would have a profound impact on the intellectual and political history of the city.

In 1898, a millenarian group called the Righteous Harmony Society Movement formed in Shandong Province, calling for the expulsion of all foreign influence in China. They attacked Westerners especially missionaries and converted Chinese, and were called the "Boxers" by Westerners. The Qing court initially suppressed the Boxers but the Empress Dowager attempted to use them to curtail foreign influence and permitted them to gather in Beijing, then expelled the Boxers from the city after ransacking occurred and ordered the foreigners in the legations to leave to Tianjin, which they refused to do. In June 1900, the Qing forces including Manchu Bannerman and Muslim fighters from Gansu and the Boxers besieged the Legation Quarter, which sheltered several hundred foreign civilians and soldiers and about 3,200 Chinese Christians. The first attempt by the foreign Eight-Nation Alliance in the Seymour Expedition was defeated and forces to turn back. On the second attempt, eventually they defeated the Boxers and Qing troops and lifted the siege. The foreign armies looted the city and occupied Beijing and the surrounding area in Zhili. Empress Dowager Cixi fled to Xi'an and did not return until after the Qing government had signed the Boxer Protocol which compelled it to pay reparations of 450 million taels of silver with interest at four percent. The Boxer indemnities stripped the Qing government of much of its tax revenues and further weakened the state.

The United States used its portion of the proceeds to fund scholarships for Chinese students studying in America. In 1911, the Boxer Indemnity Scholar Program established the American Indemnity College in the Qinghua Gardens northwest of Beijing as a preparatory school for students planning to study abroad. In 1912, the school was renamed Tsinghua University, and remains to this day, one of the finest institutions of higher learning in China.

After the Boxer Rebellion, the struggling Qing dynasty accelerated the pace of reform and became more receptive to foreign influence. The centuries-old imperial civil service examination was abolished in 1905, and replaced with a Western-style curriculum and degree system. Public education for women received greater emphasis and even drew support from reactionaries like the Empress Dowager. Beijing's school for girls in the late Qing period made unbound feet an entrance requirement. The Beijing Police Academy, founded in 1901 as China's first modern institution for police training, used Japanese instructors and became a model for police academies in other cities. The Peking Union Medical College, founded by missionaries in 1906 and funded by the Rockefeller Foundation from 1915, set the standard for the training of nurses. The Metropolitan University Library in Beijing, founded in 1898, was China's first modern academic library devoted to serving public higher education.

Also in 1905, the Board of Revenue and private investors founded the Hubu Bank, China's first central bank and largest modern bank. This bank was renamed the Bank of China after the Xinhai Revolution and began Beijing's tradition as the center of state banks in China. Large foreign banks including the Hongkong and Shanghai Banking Corp. (HSBC), National City Bank (Citibank), Deutsch-Asiatische Bank and Yokohama Specie Bank opened branches in the Legation Quarter. The building of railroads was capital intensive and required large-scale financing and foreign expertise. Beijing's earliest railroads were designed, financed and built under the supervision of foreign concerns.

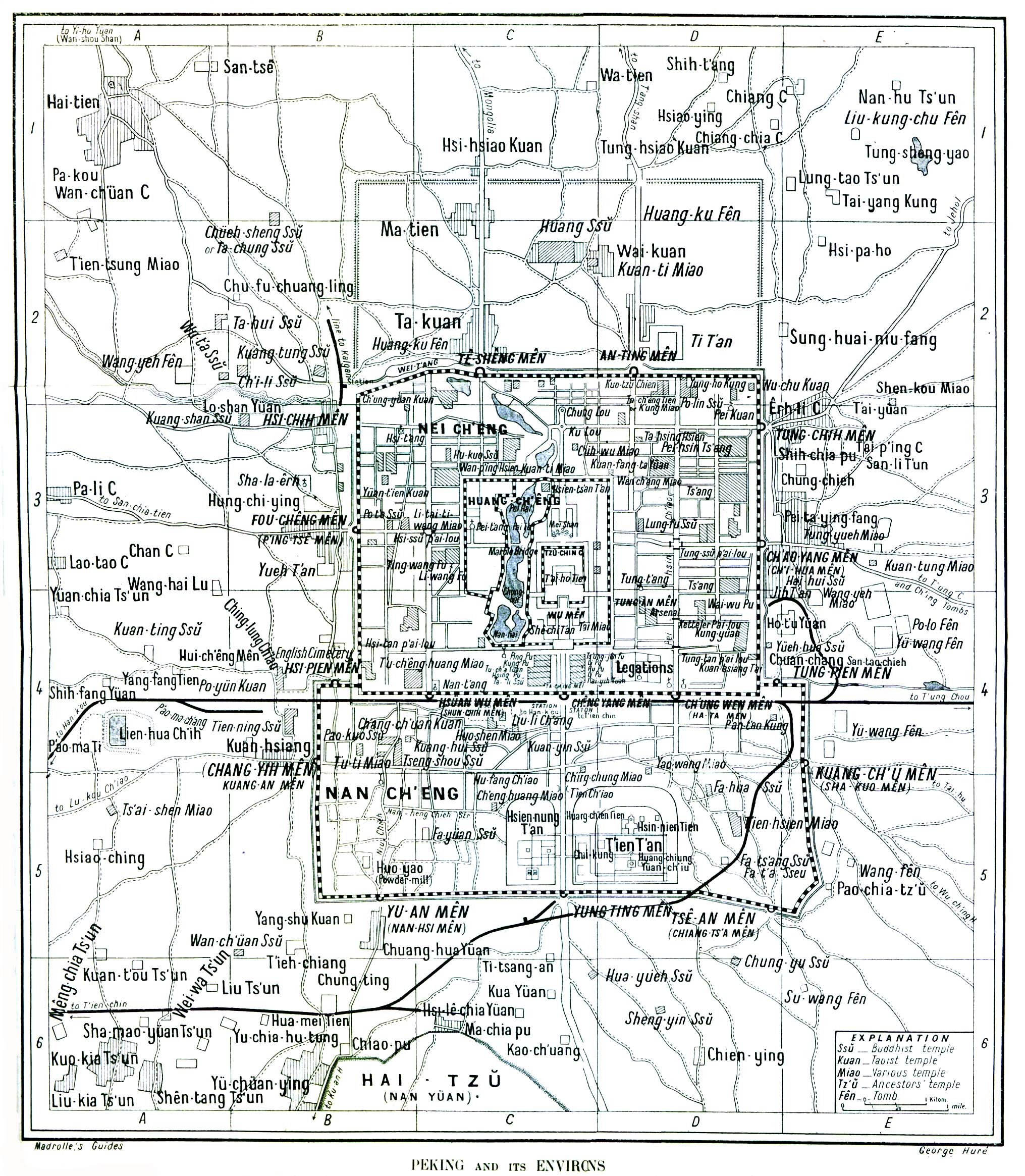
1912 map of Beijing showing city walls, railways and stations. Nei Ch'eng refers to the Inner City and Nan Ch'eng refers to the Outer City.

The first railway in China was built in Beijing in 1864 by a British merchant to demonstrate the technology to the imperial court. About 600 meters of tracks were laid outside Xuanwumen. The steam locomotive shook the neighborhood and alarmed the capital guards. The Qing court looked on the strange contraption with disfavor and had the railway dismantled. To secure the support of Empress Dowager Cixi for railway construction, Viceroy Li Hongzhang imported a small train set from Germany and in 1888 built a 2-km narrow gauge railway from her residence in Zhongnanhai to her dining hall in Beihai. The Empress, concerned that the locomotive's noise would disturb the geomancy or fengshui of the imperial city, required the train be pulled by eunuchs instead of steam engine.

The city's first commercial railway, Tianjin-Lugouqiao Railway, was built from 1895 to 1897 with British financing. It ran from the Marco Polo Bridge to Tianjin. The rail terminus was extended closer to the city to Fengtai and then to Majiapu, just outside Yongdingmen, a gate of the Outer City wall. The Qing court resisted the extension of railways inside city walls. Foreign powers who seized the city during the Boxer Rebellion extended the railway inside the outer city wall to Yongdingmen in 1900 and then further north to Zhengyangmen (Qianmen) just outside the Inner City wall in 1903. They built an eastern spur to Tongzhou to carry grain shipped from the south on the Grand Canal. This extension breached the city wall at Dongbianmen. The Lugouqiao-Hankou Railway, financed by French-Belgian capital and built from 1896 to 1905, was renamed Beijing-Hankou Railway after it was routed to Qianmen from the west. This required the partial demotion of the Xuanwumen barbican. The completion of the Beijing–Fengtian Railway in 1907 required a similar break in Chongwenmen's fortification. Thus, began the tearing down of city gates and walls to make way for rail transportation. The first railway in China built without foreign assistance was the Imperial Beijing-Zhangjiakou Railway. Built from 1905 to 1909, it was designed by Zhan Tianyou and terminated just outside Xizhimen. By the late Qing dynasty, Beijing had rail connections to Hankou (Wuhan), Pukou (Nanjing), Fengtian (Shenyang) and Datong, and was a major railway hub in North China.

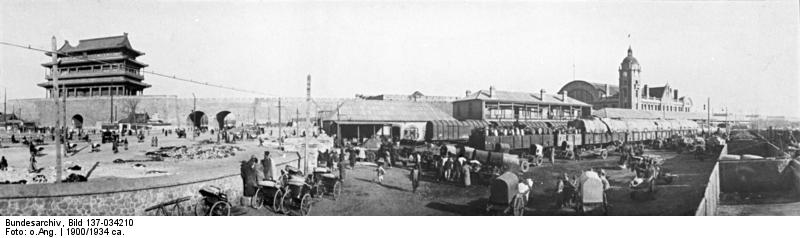
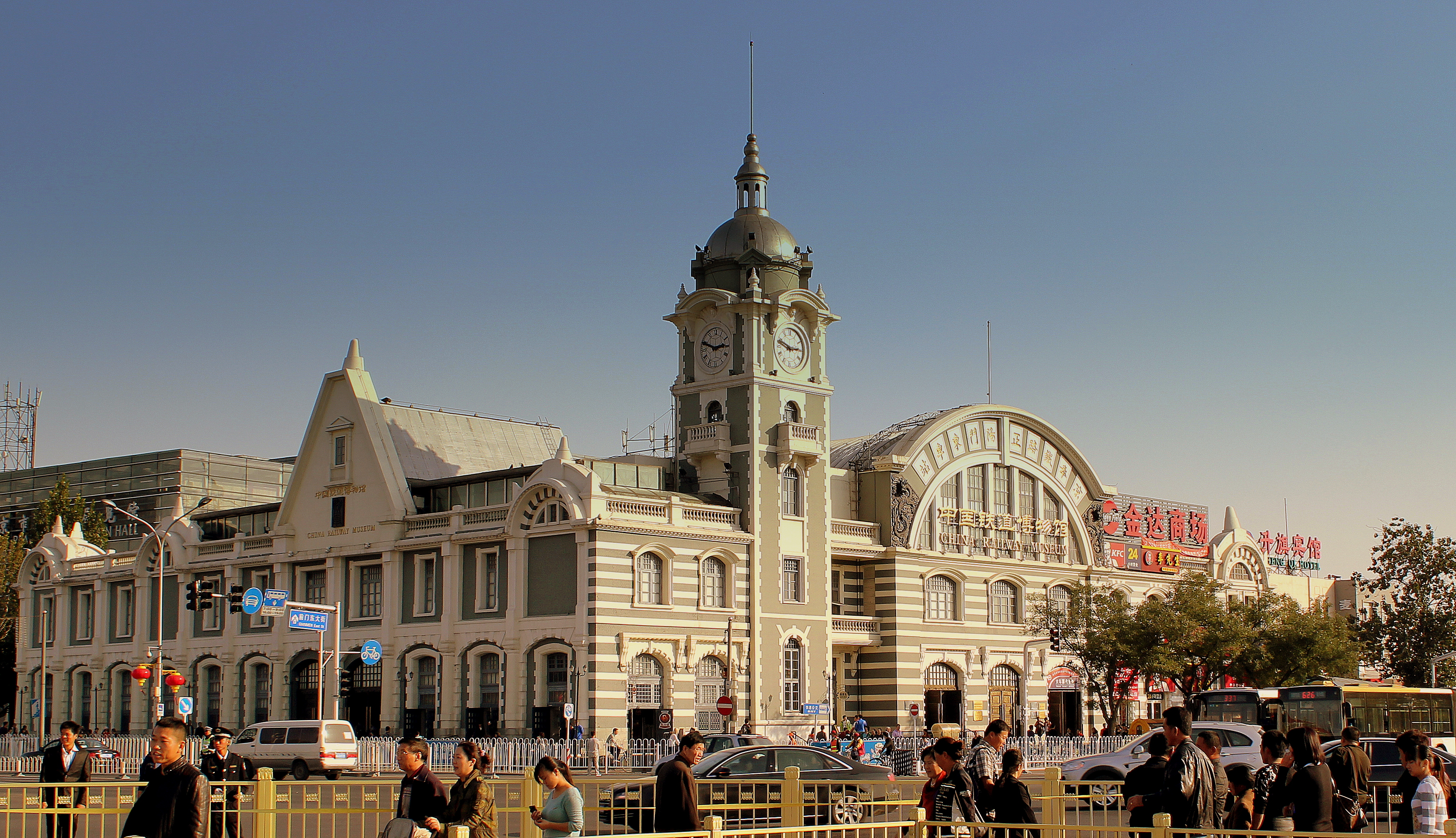
Left: Qianmen (Zhengyangmen) railway station in the 1900s. Right: The old railway station is now the China Railway Museum.

== Republic of China ==
The Qing dynasty was overthrown in the Xinhai Revolution of 1911 but the capital of the newly founded Republic of China remained in Beijing as former Qing general Yuan Shikai took control of the new government from revolutionaries in the south. Yuan and successors from his Beiyang Army ruled the Republic from Beijing until 1928 when Chinese Nationalists reunified the country through the Northern Expedition and moved the capital to Nanjing. Beijing was renamed Beiping. In 1937, a clash between Chinese and Japanese troops at the Marco Polo Bridge outside Beiping triggered the outbreak of the Second Sino-Japanese War. Japanese occupiers created a collaborationist government in northern China and reverted the city's name to Beijing to serve as capital for the puppet regime. After Japan's surrender in 1945, the city returned to Chinese rule and was again renamed Beiping. During the subsequent civil war between the Chinese Nationalists and Communists, the city was peacefully transferred to Communist control in 1949 and renamed Beijing to become the capital of the People's Republic of China.

=== Xinhai Revolution ===
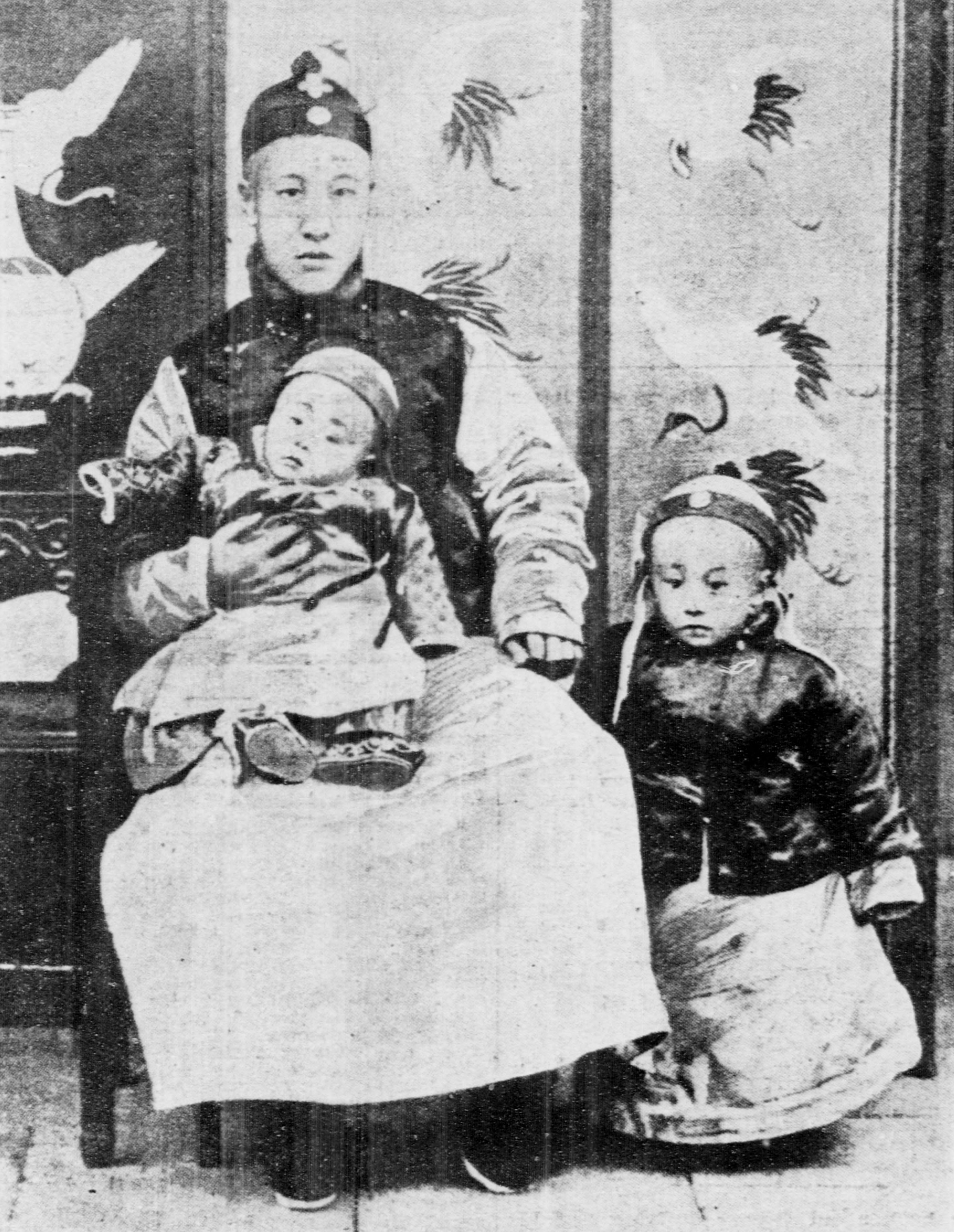
Regent Prince Chun (seated) asked Yuan Shikai to quell the Wuchang Uprising in October 1911, but agreed to end the Qing dynasty in February 1912 to secure the safety of the royal family. His son, Puyi (standing) was the Last Emperor.

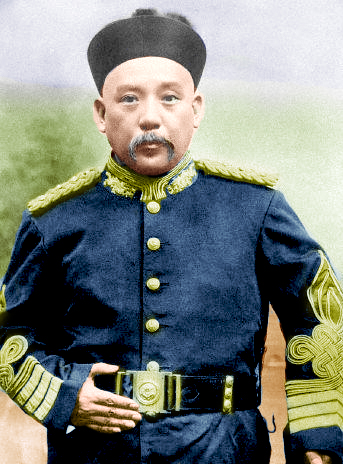
Yuan Shikai seized control of the Xinhai Revolution by extracting the abdication of the imperial court and the provisional presidency of the Republic.

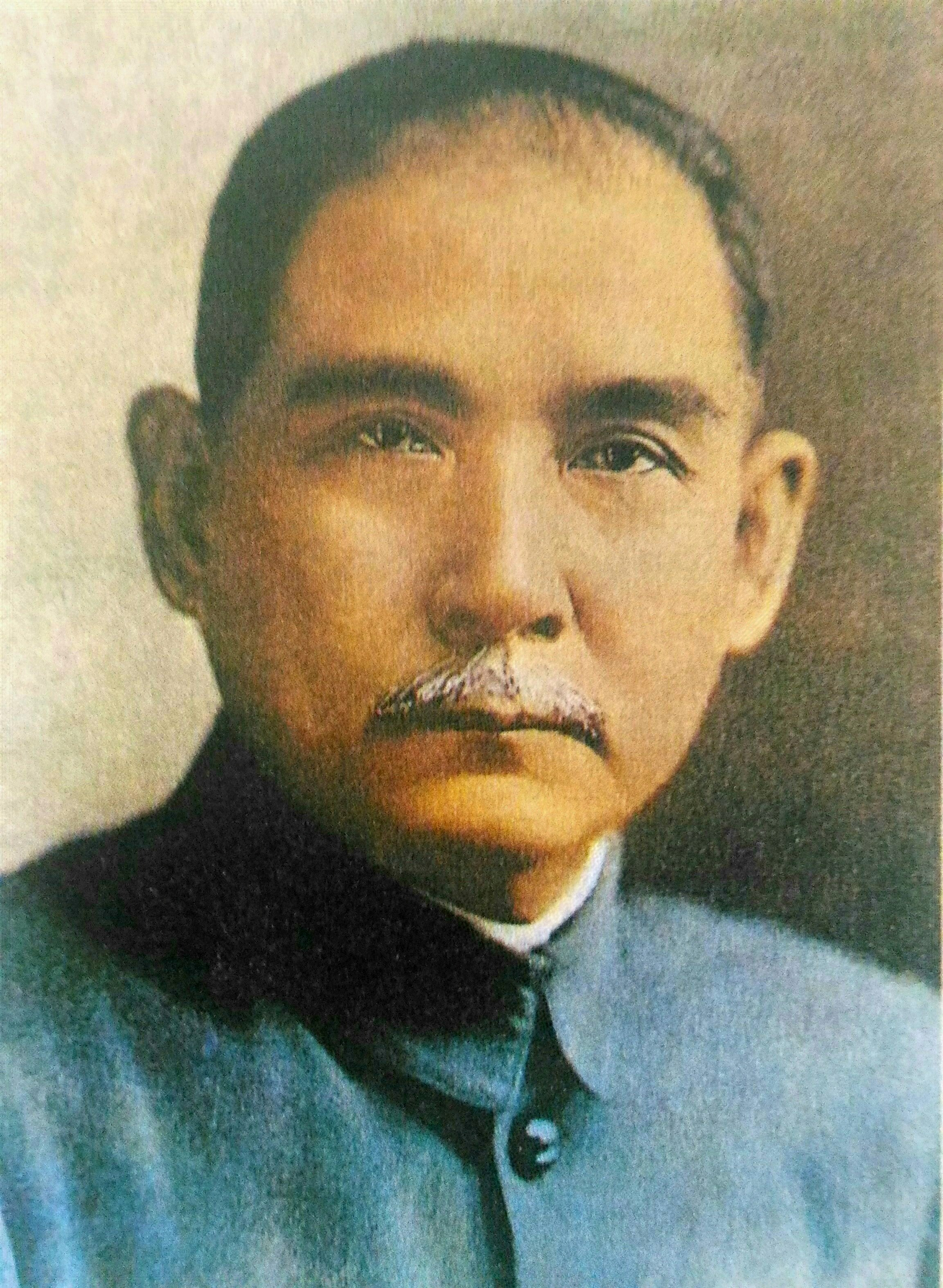
Sun Yat-sen founded the new Republic but agreed to give the provisional presidency to Yuan Shikai. Sun then formed the Chinese Nationalist Party in Beijing, which won the first national elections in 1913.

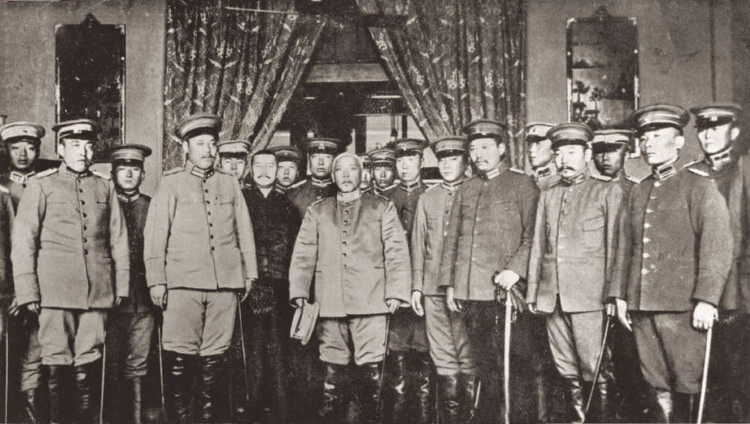
Yuan Shikai was inaugurated as the provisional president of the newly established Republic of China in Beijing on March 10, 1912. He maneuvered to keep the capital of the new republic in Beijing where his Beiyang Army held sway.

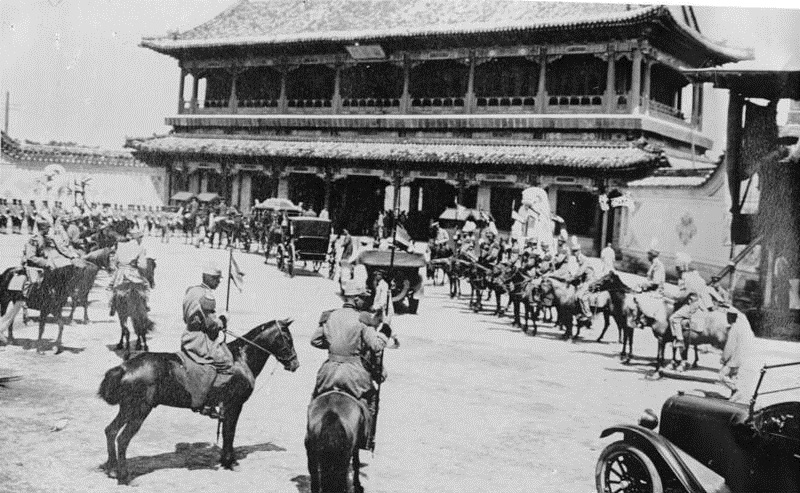
Yuan based his office and residence in the Zhongnanhai Compound next to the Forbidden City. The New China Gate was built as the southern entrance to Zhongnanhai during Yuan's reign. Above: honor guard accompanying a foreign delegation in 1924.

When the Wuchang Uprising erupted in October 1911, the Qing court summoned Yuan Shikai and his powerful Beiyang Army to suppress the insurrection. As he fought revolutionaries in the south, Yuan also negotiated with them. On January 1, 1912, Dr. Sun Yat-sen, who returned from exile, founded the Republic of China in Nanjing and was elected provisional president. The new government was not recognized by any foreign powers, and Sun agreed to cede leadership to Yuan Shikai in exchange for the latter's assistance in ending the Qing dynasty. On February 12, Yuan compelled the Qing court, under the regency of Prince Chun, to abdicate. Empress Dowager Longyu signed the abdication agreement on behalf of the five-year-old Last Emperor, Puyi. The following day Sun resigned from the provisional presidency and recommended Yuan for the position. Under the terms of the imperial abdication, the Puyi would retain his dignitary title and staff and receive an annual stipend of 4 million Mexican silver dollars from the Republic. He was permitted to continue to reside in the Forbidden City for a time but was required to eventually move to the Summer Palace. His tomb and rituals were to be maintained at the expense of the Republic. The abdication ended the Qing dynasty and averted further bloodshed in the revolution.

As a condition for ceding leadership to Yuan, Sun insisted that the provisional government remain in Nanjing. On February 14, the Provisional Senate initially voted 20–5 in favor of making Beijing the capital over Nanjing, with two votes going for Wuhan and one for Tianjin. The Senate majority wanted to secure the peace agreement by taking power in Beijing. Zhang Jian and others reasoned that having the capital in Beijing would check against Manchu restoration and Mongol secession. But Sun and Huang Xing argued in favor of Nanjing to balance against Yuan's power base in the north. Li Yuanhong presented Wuhan as a compromise. The next day, the Provisional Senate voted again, this time, 19–6 in favor of Nanjing with two votes for Wuhan. Sun sent a delegation led by Cai Yuanpei and Wang Jingwei to persuade Yuan to move to Nanjing. Yuan welcomed the delegation and agreed to accompany the delegates back to the south. Then on the evening of February 29, riots and fires broke out in all over the city. They were allegedly started by disobedient troops of Cao Kun, a loyal officer of Yuan. Disorder among military ranks spread to Tongzhou, Tianjin and Baoding. These events gave Yuan the pretext to stay in the north to guard against unrest. On March 10, Yuan was inaugurated in Beijing as the provisional president of the Republic of China. Yuan based the executive office and residence in Zhongnanhai, next to the Forbidden City. On April 5, the Provisional Senate in Nanjing voted to make Beijing the capital of the Republic and convened in Beijing at the end of the month.

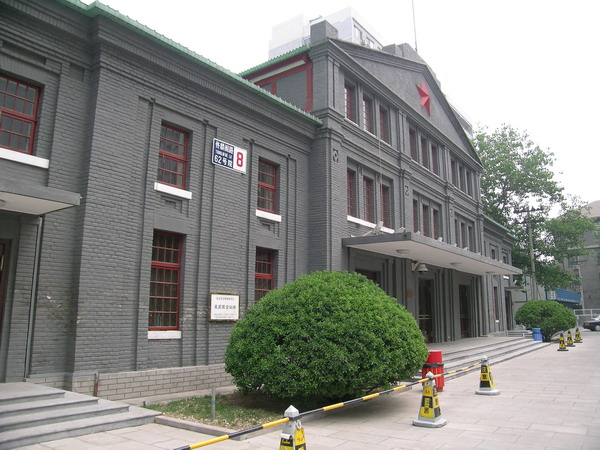
The Xinhua News Agency Auditorium on Tong Lin'ge Road in Xicheng District, was the National Assembly Building during the early Republic. The first elected National Assembly convened here in April 1913.

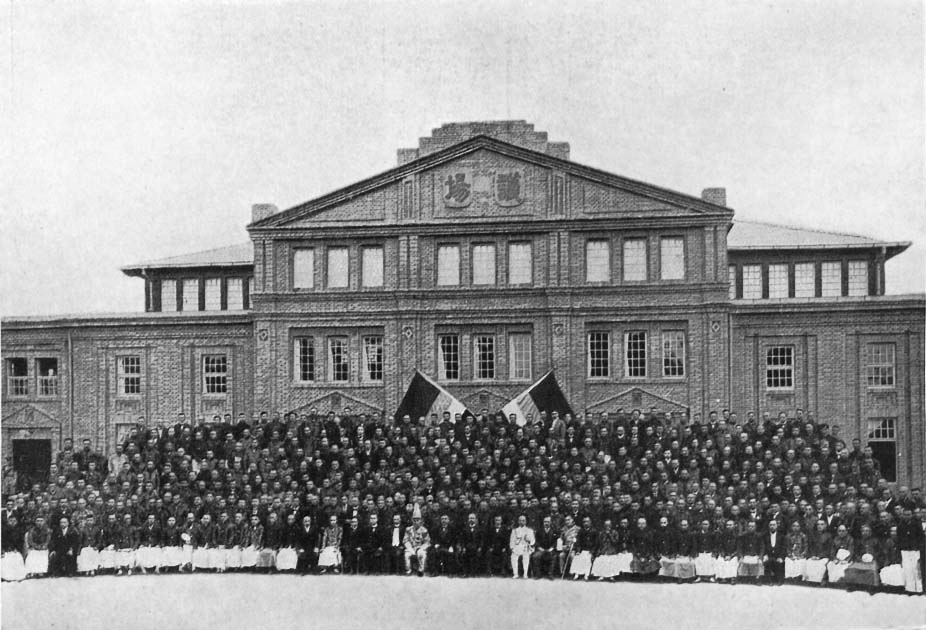
The first elected National Assembly was dissolved by Yuan Shikai in 1914, reconvened by Duan Qirui in 1916, dissolved by Zhang Xun during the imperial restoration in 1917, and reconvened again in 1922. (Pictured here on August 1, 1916)

In August, Sun Yat-sen traveled to Beijing where he was welcomed by Yuan Shikai and a crowd of thousands. At the Huguang Guild Hall, the Revolutionary Alliance (Tongmenghui) led by Sun, Huang Xing and Song Jiaoren joined several smaller parties to form the Kuomintang. The first national assembly elections were held from December 1912 to January 1913. Adult males over the age of 21 who were educated or owned property and paid taxes and who could prove two-year residency in a particular county could vote. An estimated 4–6% of China's population were registered for the election. The Nationalist Party won a majority in both houses of the National Assembly, which convened in Beijing in April 1913.

As the assembly set out to ratify the constitution, Yuan resisted efforts to share power. Without the assembly's knowledge, he arranged for the large and expensive Reorganization Loan from a consortium of foreign lenders to fund his military. The loan, signed into effect at the HSBC Bank in the Legation Quarter, effectively surrendered the government's collection of salt tax revenues to foreign control. Yuan's agents assassinated Nationalist leader Song Jiaoren in Shanghai. In response, Sun Yat-sen launched a Second Revolution in July 1913, which failed and forced him into exile. Yuan then forced the National Assembly to elect him as the president and expel Nationalist members. In early 1914, he dissolved the National Assembly and abolished the provisional constitution in May. On December 23, 1915, Yuan declared himself emperor, and his regime, the Empire of China (1915–1916). This declaration provoked the National Protection War as provinces in the south rebelled. Yuan was forced to step down from emperor to president in March 1916. He died in Beijing in June 1916, leaving military men from the Beiyang Army vying for control of the government. Over the next 12 years, the Beiyang Government in Beijing had no fewer than eight presidents, five parliaments, 24 cabinets, at least four constitutions and one brief restoration of the Manchu Monarchy.

Unlike prior dynastic changes, the end of Qing rule in Beijing did not cause a substantial decline in the city's population, which was 785,442 in 1910, 670,000 in 1913 and 811,566 in 1917. The population of the surrounding region grew from 1.7 to 2.9 million over the same period. In 1917, Beijing was the fourth largest city in China after Guangzhou, Shanghai and Hankou, and the seventh largest capital city in the world.

=== World War I and the May 4th Movement ===
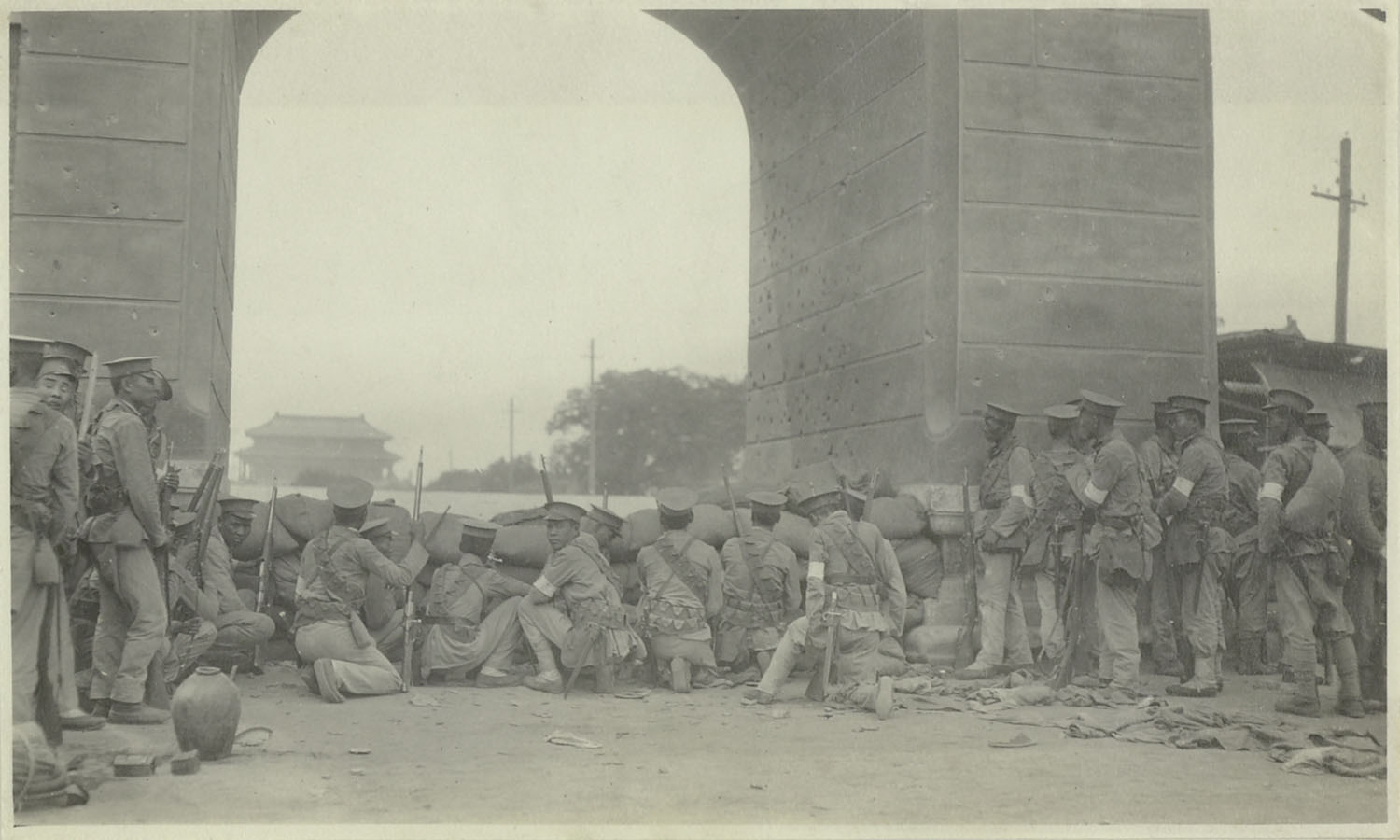
Republican troops fighting to retake the Forbidden City on July 12, 1917, during the short-lived Manchu Restoration.

After Yuan's death, Li Yuanhong became president and Duan Qirui, the prime minister, and the National Assembly was reconvened. The government soon faced a crisis over whether to enter World War I on the side of the Allied Powers or remain neutral. Li dismissed Duan, who favored entry into the war, and invited warlord Zhang Xun to the capital to mediate. Zhang and his pigtailed loyalist army marched into Beijing, dissolved the National Assembly and restored Puyi as Qing emperor on July 1. Li fled to the Japanese Embassy in the Legation. The imperial restoration lasted just 12 days as Duan Qirui's army reclaimed the capital, and sent Zhang seeking refuge in the Dutch Embassy. Under Duan's command, China declared war on the Central Powers and sent 140,000 Chinese laborers to work on the Western Front. With financial backing from Japan, Duan then engineered the election of a new parliament in 1918 that was stacked his supporters from the Anhui clique. The so-called Anfu Parliament was named after Anfu Hutong, near Zhongnanhai where Duan's Anhui-based supporters congregated.

In the spring of 1919, the Republic of China, as a victor nation sent a delegation to the Paris Peace Conference seeking the return of German concession in Shandong Province to China. Instead, the Treaty of Versailles gave those possessions to Japan. News of the treaty sparked outrage in the Chinese capital. On May 4, 3,000 students from 13 universities in Beijing gathered in Tiananmen Square to protest the betrayal of China by the other Western powers and the corruption of the Anfu government by Japanese financial support. They marched toward the foreign legation but were blocked and proceeded to the home of deputy foreign minister Cao Rulin, who had attended the Peace Conference and was known to be friendly to Japanese interests. They razed Cao's residence and beat up Zhang Zongxiang, another pro-Japanese diplomat. The police arrested 32 students, which provoked further protests and arrests. Within weeks, the movement had spread to 200 cities and towns in 22 provinces. Workers in Shanghai struck and merchants closed shops in support of the protests. By late June, the government pledged not to sign the treaty, removed Cao and Zhang from office and released students from jail.

May Fourth Movement, 1919
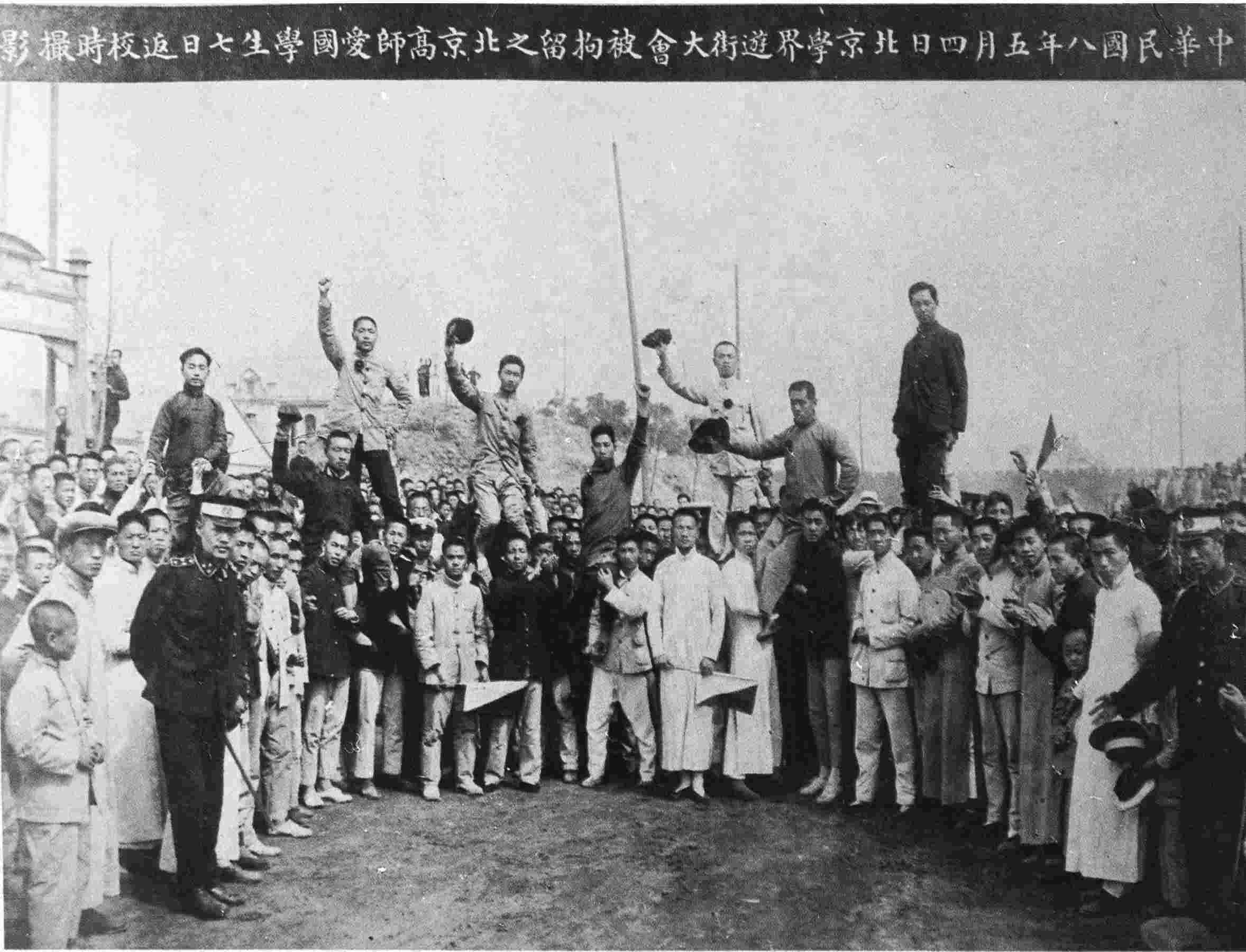
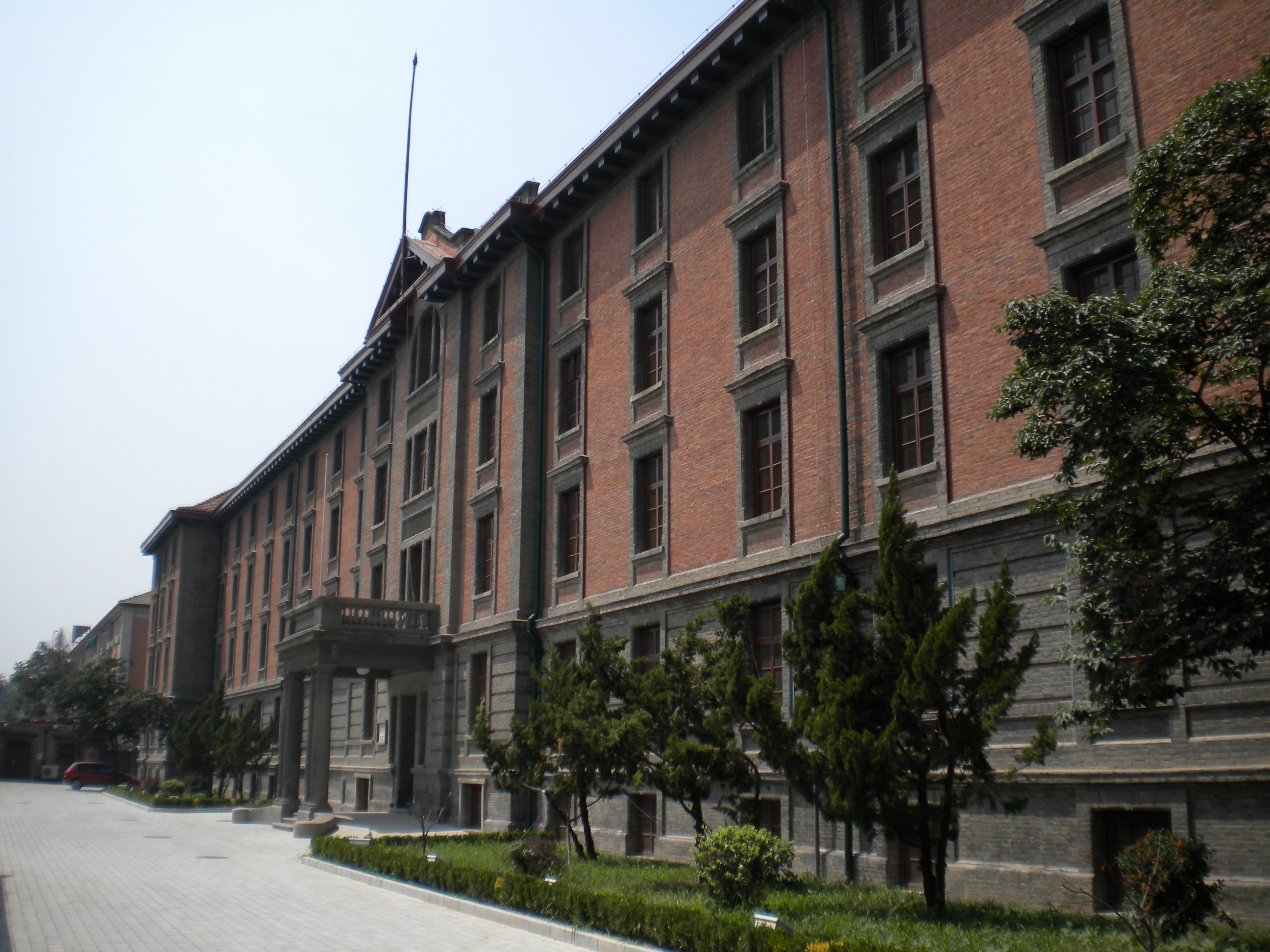
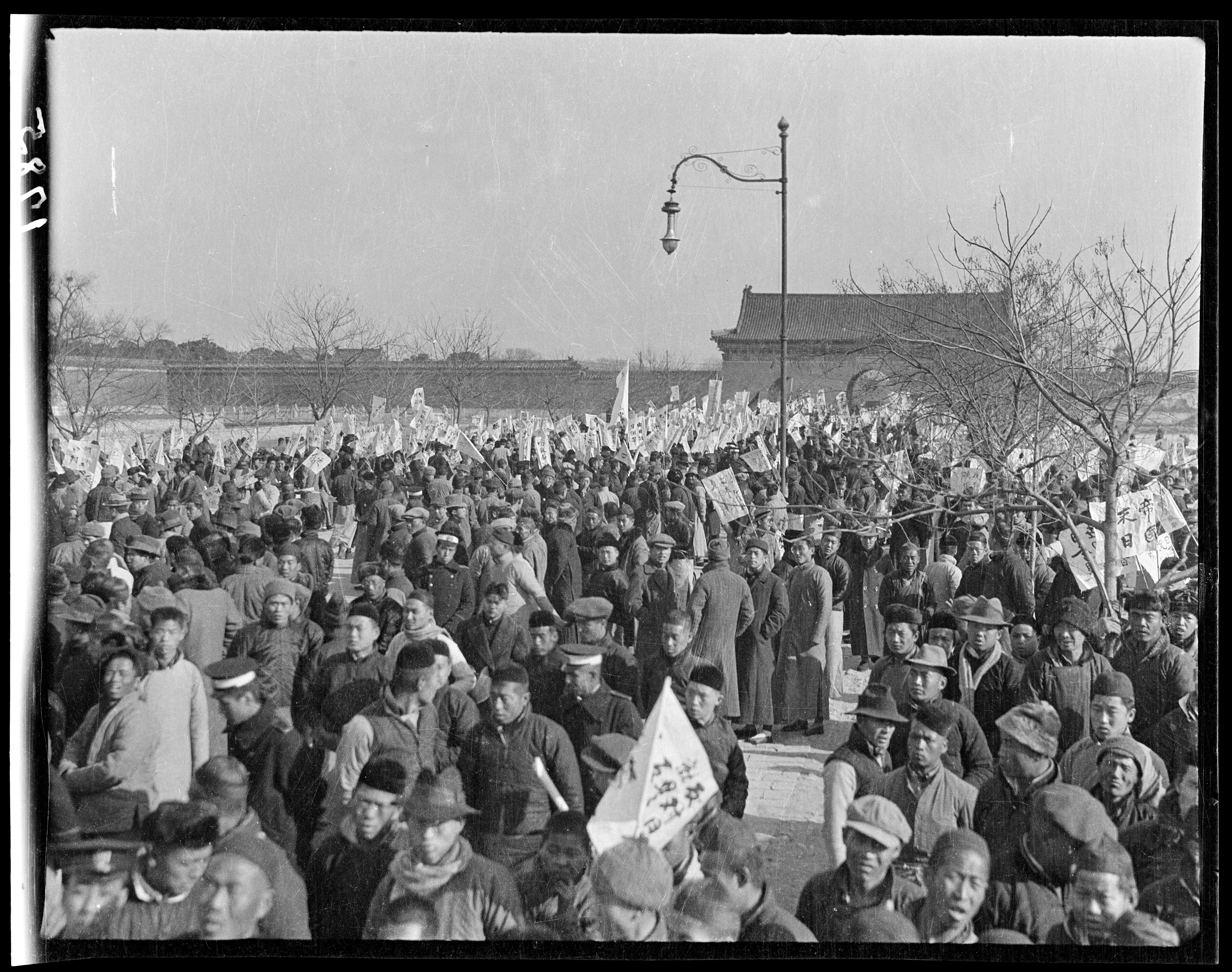
Middle: Peking University (shown here the "Red Building" on what is now May 4th Boulevard), played a prominent role in the Movement. Left: Students arrested in the demonstrations returned triumphantly to campus on May 7th after their release. Right: the Movement began a tradition of popular student protest in Beijing as students marched again in Tiananmen Square in November 1919 to protest Japanese imperialism.

The May Fourth Movement began a tradition of student activism in Beijing and had a profound political and cultural impact on modern China. Leading intellectuals including Cai Yuanpei and Hu Shih at Peking University, encouraged the development of new culture to replace the traditional order. The movement also heightened the appeal of Marxism-Leninism as Chen Duxiu and Li Dazhao, prominent May 4 figures, became early leaders of the Chinese Communist Party. Among the many youth who flocked to the Chinese capital during this period was a student from Hunan named Mao Zedong who worked as a library assistant under Li Dazhao at Peking University. Mao left the city for Shanghai in 1920 where he helped found the Chinese Communist Party in 1921. He did not return to Beijing until almost 30 years later.

=== Beiyang regime ===
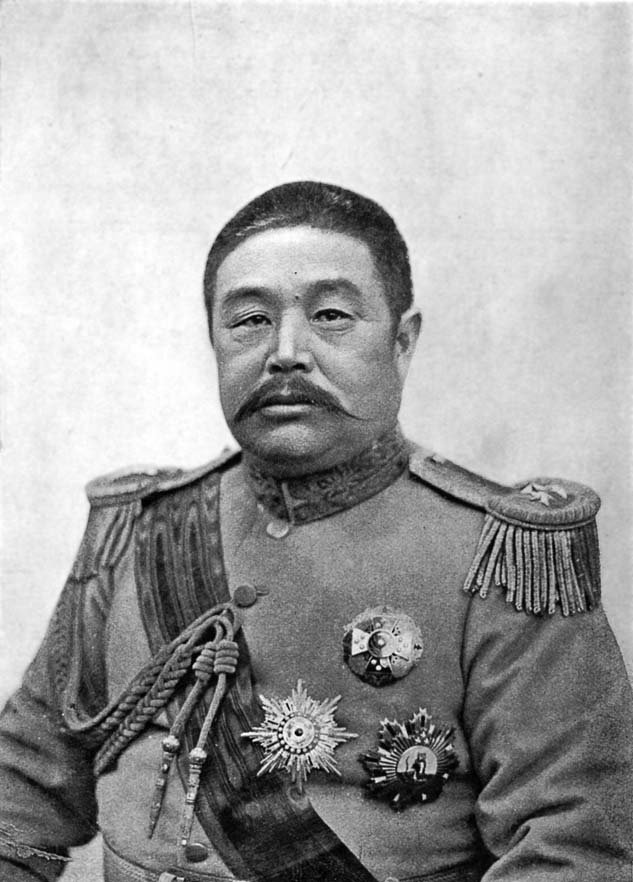
Li Yuanhong

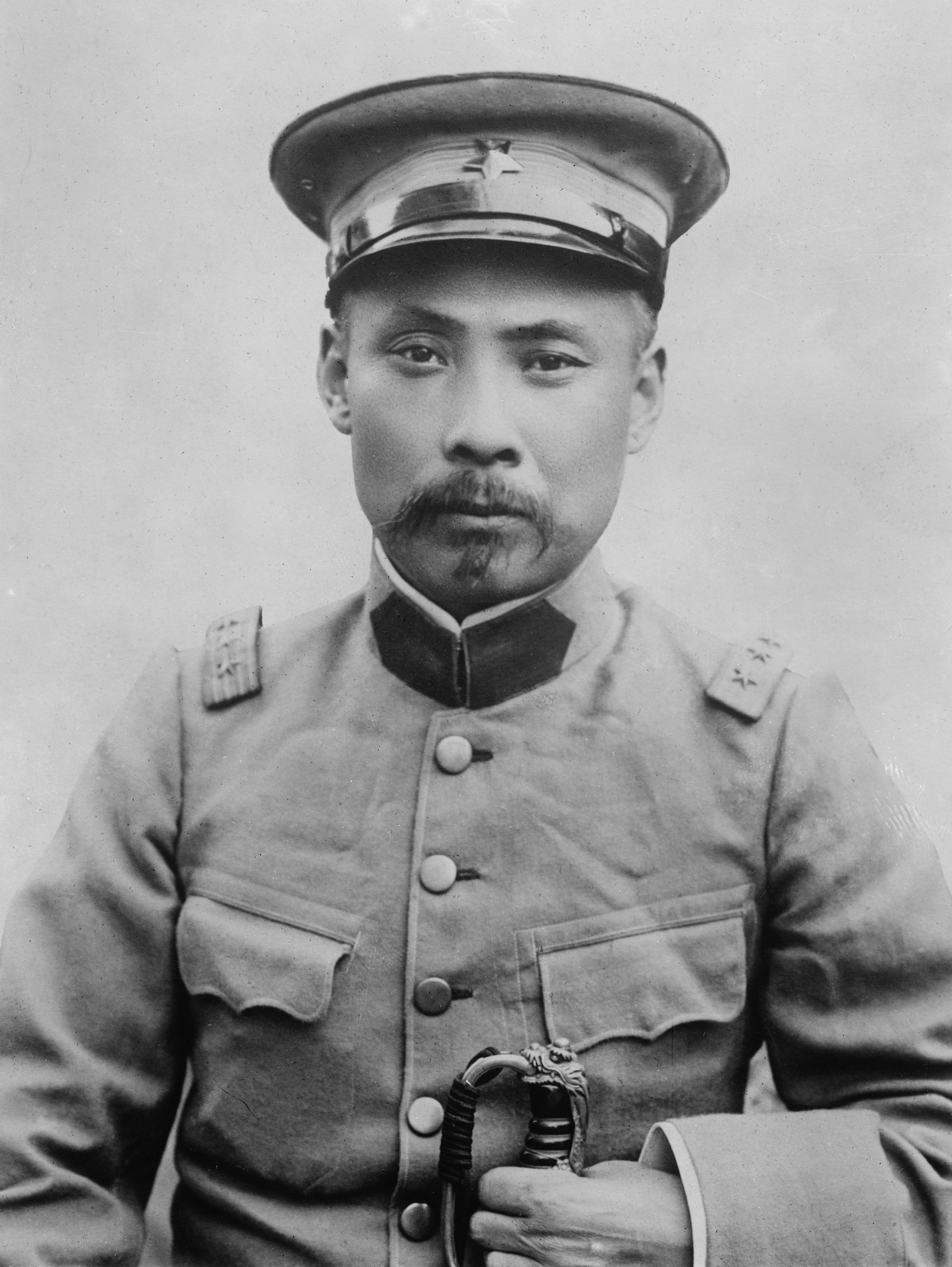
Duan Qirui

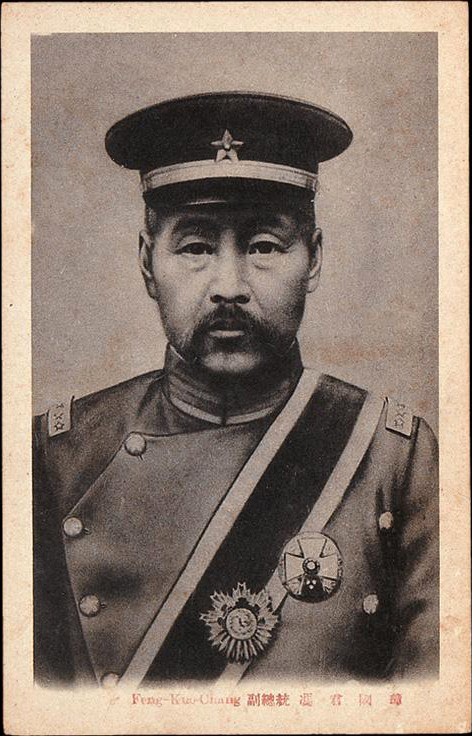
Feng Guozhang

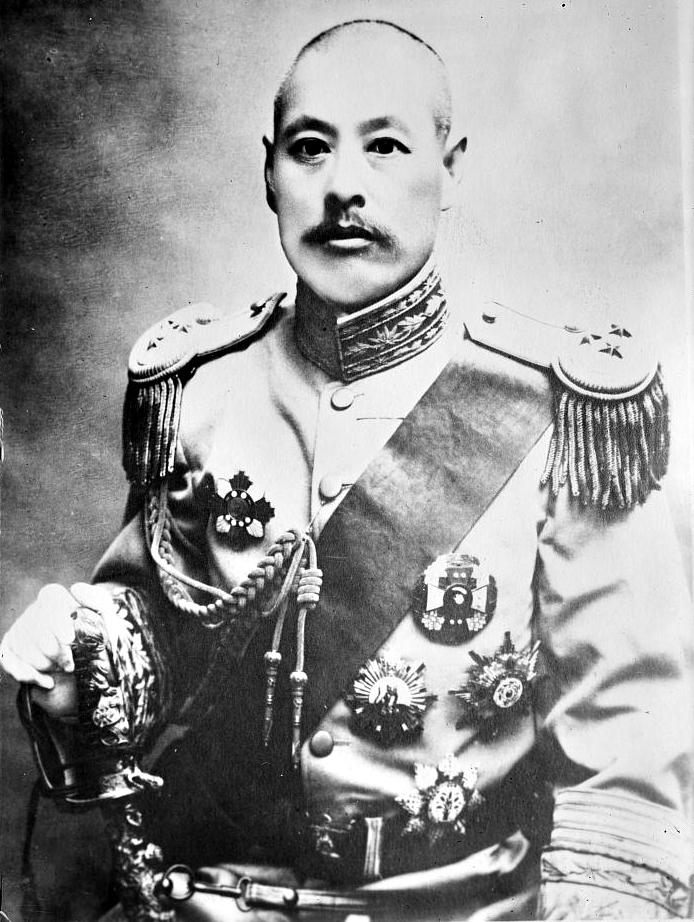
Wu Peifu

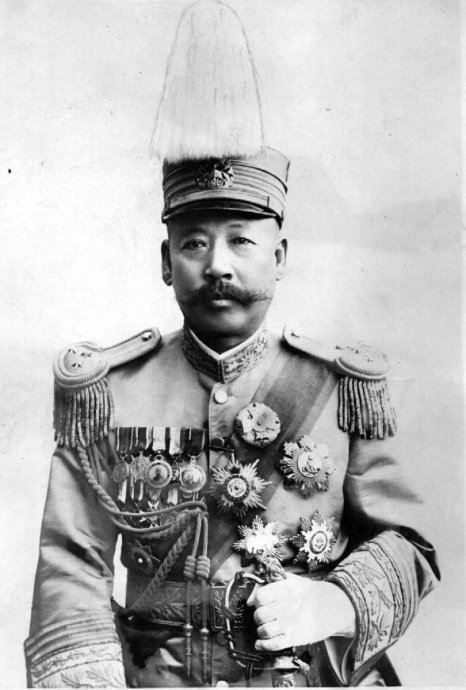
Cao Kun

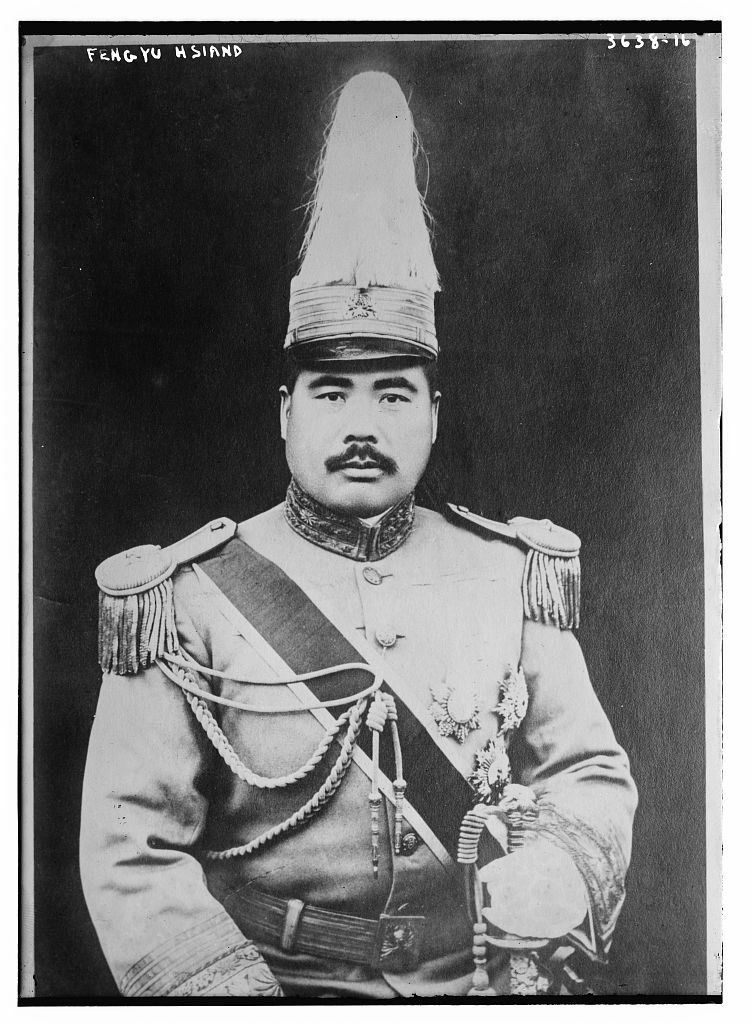
Feng Yuxiang

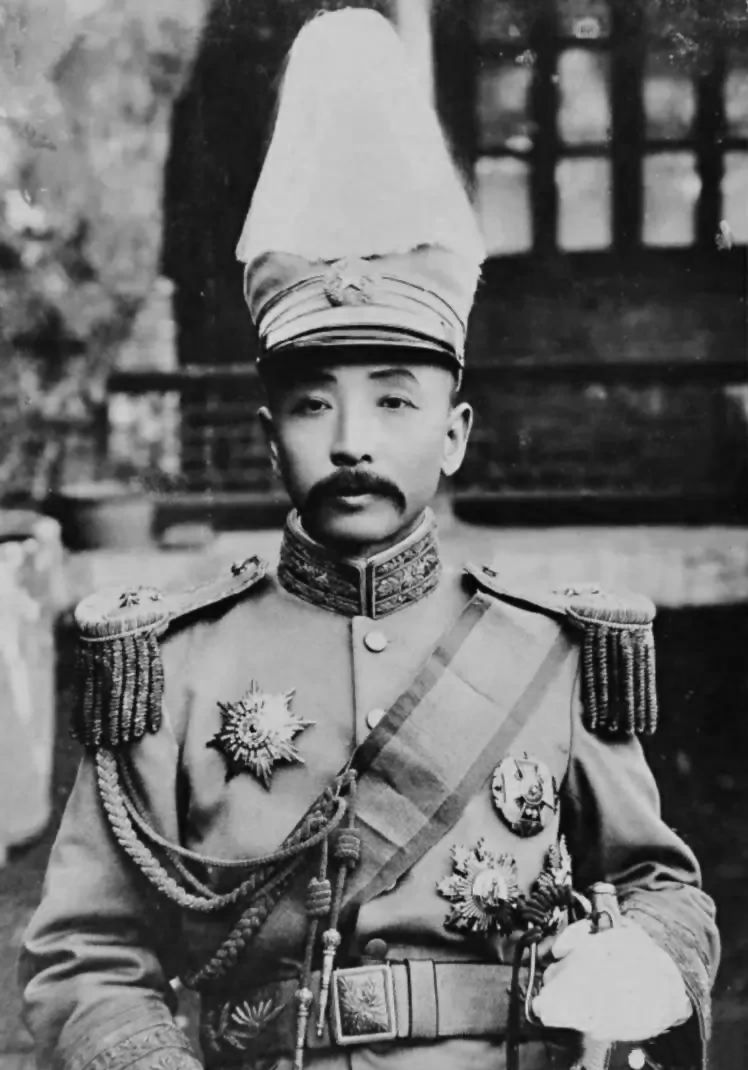
Zhang Zuolin

Military strongmen of the Beiyang Government in Beijing
March 18 Massacre, 1926

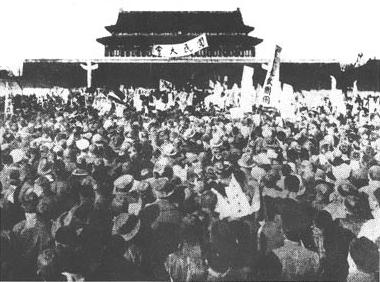
Students demonstrated in Tiananmen Square on March 18, 1926, against the special privileges of foreign powers in China.

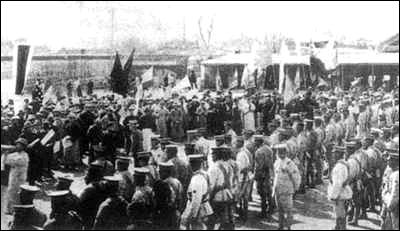
After the students marched to Duan Qirui's presidential office on the Iron Lion Hutong, now Zhang Zizhong Road, they were confronted by soldiers and bloodshed ensued.

In the 1920s, military strongmen of the Beiyang Army split into cliques and vied for control of the Republican government and its capital. In July 1920, Duan's government, weakened by the May 4 Protests, was driven out of Beijing by Wu Peifu and Cao Kun of the Zhili clique in the Zhili–Anhui War. Two years later, the Zhili Clique fought off a challenge by Zhang Zuolin and his Manchuria-based Fengtian clique in the First Zhili–Fengtian War. When the two sides squared off again in Second Zhili–Fengtian War in 1924, one of Wu's officers Feng Yuxiang launched the Beijing Coup. On October 23, 1924, Feng seized the capital, imprisoned President Cao Kun, restored Duan Qirui as the head of state and invited Sun Yat-sen to Beijing for peace talks. At that time, Sun was building a Nationalist regime in Guangzhou with the assistance of the Soviet Comintern and support of the Chinese Communist Party. Sun was stricken with cancer when he arrived in Beijing in early 1925 for one last effort to heal the north–south divide. He was welcomed by hundreds of civic organizations and called on Duan to include broad segments of civil society in reconstructing a united government. He died in Beijing on March 12, 1925, and was entombed at the Temple of Azure Clouds.

Zhang Zuolin and Wu Peifu joined forces against Feng Yuxiang, who relied on support from the Soviet Union. Feng took a generally accommodating stance toward the Nationalist and Communist parties which were active in spreading influence in the city. During this period, Beijing was a hotbed of student activism. In the May 30th Movement of 1925, 12,000 students from 90 schools marched through Wangfujing to Tiananmen in support of protesters in Shanghai. With the opening of private colleges such as Yenching University in 1919 and the Catholic University of Peking in 1925, the student population in Beijing grew substantially in the early 1920s. Middle school students also joined the protests. In October, students protested against imperialism during an international conference on customs and tariffs held in the city. In November, Li Dazhao organized the "Capital Revolution" a protest by students and workers demanding Duan's resignation. The protest was more violent, burning down a major newspaper office, but was disbanded.

Though the Nationalists, under Sun's leadership, had allied with the Communists in the struggle against warlords, this alliance was not without tension. In November 1925, a group of right-wing Nationalist leaders met in the Western Hills and called for the expulsion of Communists from the Nationalist Party and severance of ties with the Comintern including advisor Mikhail Borodin. This manifesto was denounced by the Nationalists' party center in Guangzhou led by Chiang Kai-shek, Wang Jingwei, and Hu Hanmin, and members of the so-called "Western Hills Group" were either expelled or left out of the party leadership. They moved to Shanghai and regained power during the rupture between the Nationalists and Communists in April 1927.

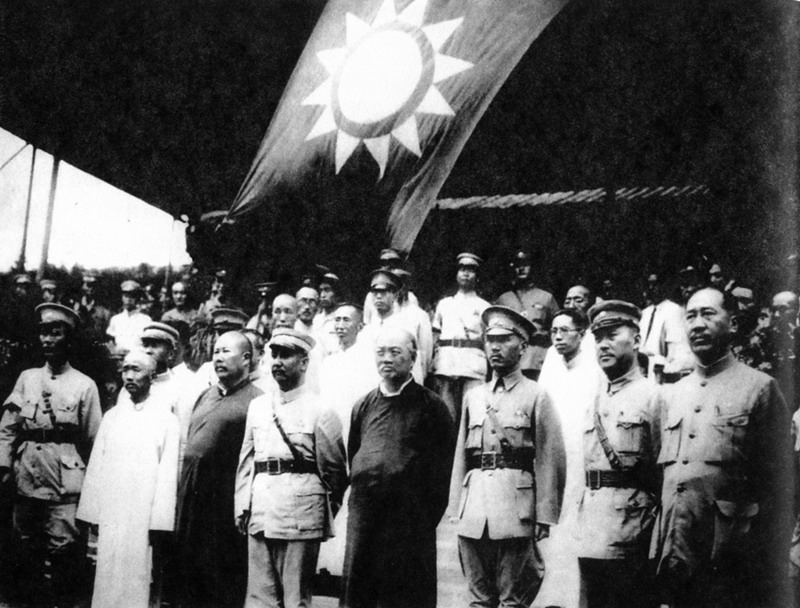
Shortly after taking Beijing during the Northern Expedition, Nationalist Party leaders led by Chiang Kai-shek gathered at the Temple of Azure Clouds on July 6, 1928, to pay homage to Sun Yat-sen. Sun's tomb and the seat of national government were both moved to Nanjing. Beijing was renamed Beiping. Front row from left: Bai Chongxi, Ma Sida, Ma Fuxiang, Yan Xishan, Wu Zhihui, Chiang, Chen Diaoyuan, Zhang Zuobao, and He Chengjun.

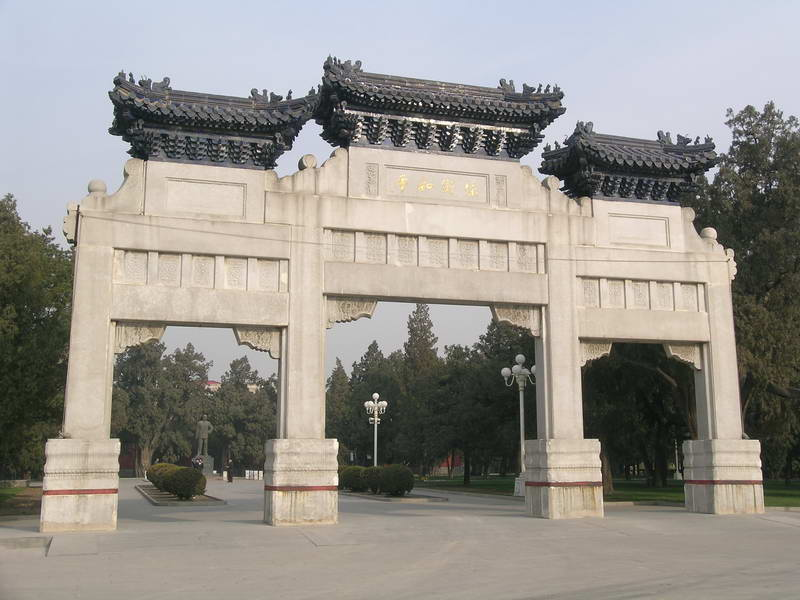
The Imperial Altar of Earth and Harvest located inside the Forbidden City between Tiananmen and Zhongnanhai became a city park in 1914. In 1928, the park was renamed "Zhongshan Park" in honor of Sun, whose statue is visible in the background. (One of his alternative appellations is Sun Zhongshan).

On March 17, 1926, Feng Yuxiang's Guominjun troops at Dagu Fort near Tianjin exchanged fire with Japanese warships carrying Zhang Zuolin's Fengtian troops. Japan accused the Chinese government of violating the Boxer Protocol and, with the other seven Boxer Powers, issued an ultimatum demanding the removal of all defenses between Beijing and the sea as set forth under the Protocols. The ultimatum provoked student protests in Beijing that were jointly organized by the left-wing Nationalists and Communists. Two thousand students marched on Duan Qirui's executive office and called for the abrogation of the unequal treaties. Police opened fire and killed over 50 and wounded 200 in what became known as the March 18 Massacre. The government issued warrants for the arrest of Nationalists and Communists including Li Dazhao, who fled to the Soviet Embassy in the Legation quarters. Within weeks, Feng Yuxiang was defeated by Zhang Zuolin and Duan's government fell. After Zhang took power, both the Nationalists and Communists were driven underground. A year later, Zhang Zuolin raided the Soviet Embassy in the Legation and seized Li Dazhao. Li and 19 others Communist and Nationalist activists were executed in Beijing on April 25, 1927.

Zhang Zuolin controlled the Beiyang Government until June 1928 when the Nationalists on the Northern Expedition led by Chiang Kai-shek and allies Yan Xishan and Feng Yuxiang jointly advanced on Beijing. Zhang left the city for Manchuria and was assassinated en route by the Japanese Kwantung Army. Beijing was handed over peacefully to the victorious Nationalists who moved the capital and Sun Yat-sen's tomb to Nanjing. For the first time since 1421, Beijing was renamed Beiping 北平 (Wade–Giles: Peip'ing), or "Northern Peace". Following the Northern Expedition, Beijing was under the de facto control of Shanxi warlord Yan Xishan who had allied himself with Nationalists. On 2 March 1929, the city was the place of a violent mutiny of soldiers who formerly belonged to the army of warlord Zhang Zongchang, a subordinate of Zhang Zuolin. Though the mutineers managed to seize the Yonghe Temple and spread terror in Beijing, their revolt was quickly suppressed. The city was made the provincial capital of Hebei Province, but lost that status to Tianjin in 1930. During the Central Plains War in 1930, Yan Xishan briefly tried to establish a rival national government in Beijing but lost the city to Zhang Xueliang, the son of Zhang Zuolin who was allied with Chiang Kai-shek.

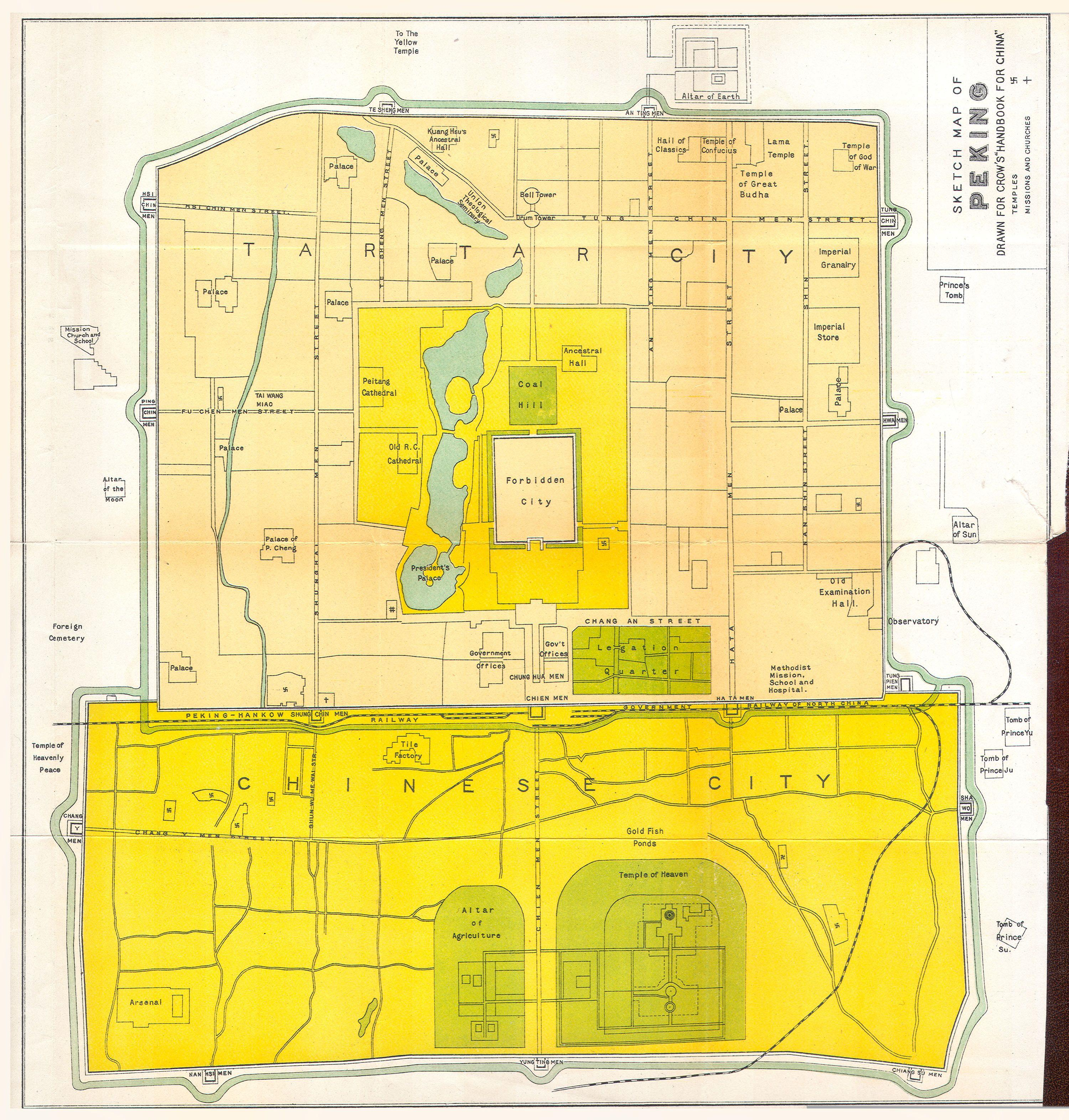
1925 map of Beijing

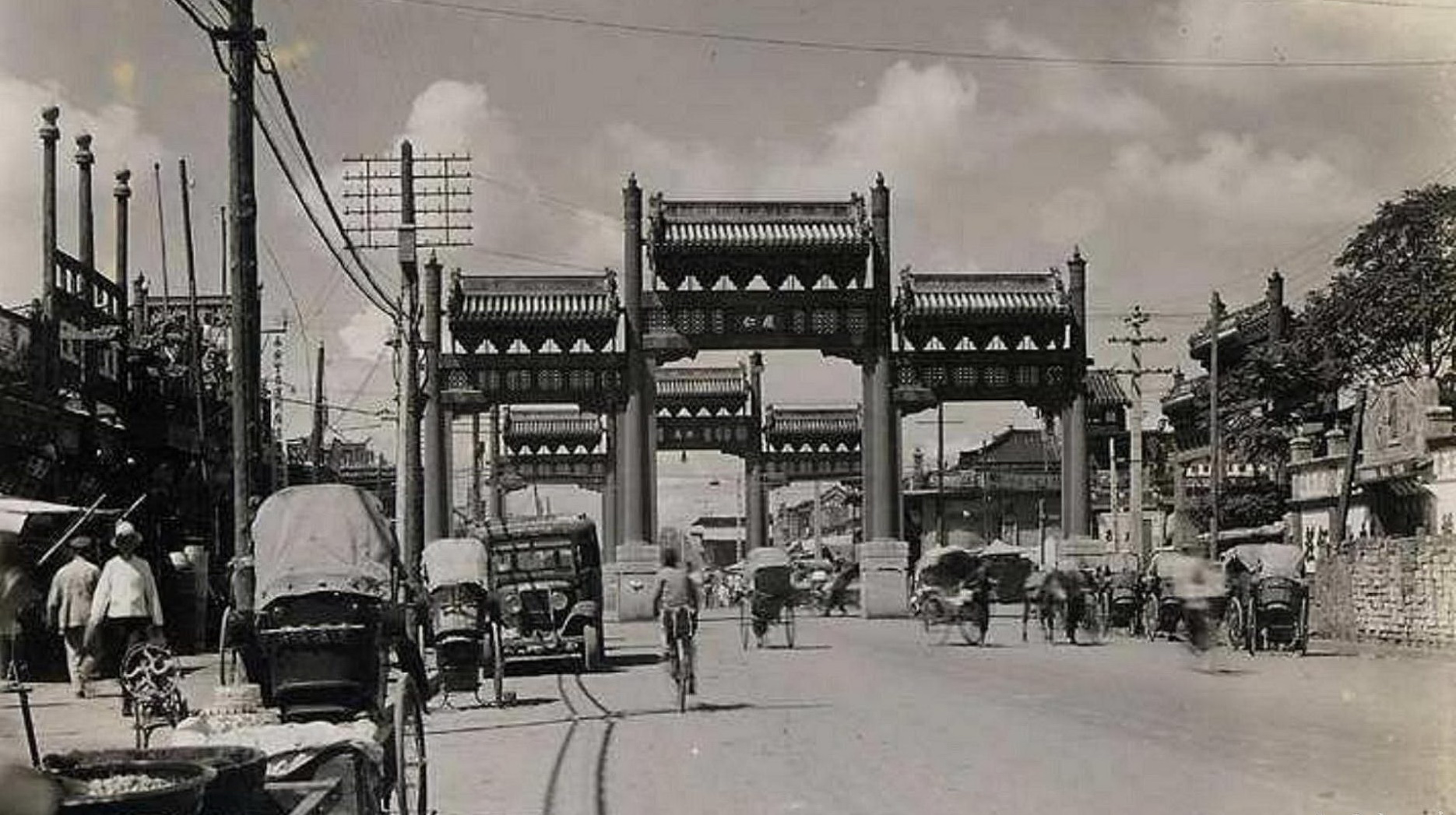
Dongsi Subdistrict, or the Eastern Quadrangle, is named after the four sign gates that marked the intersection, which were torn down in 1958. (Pictured in 1920)

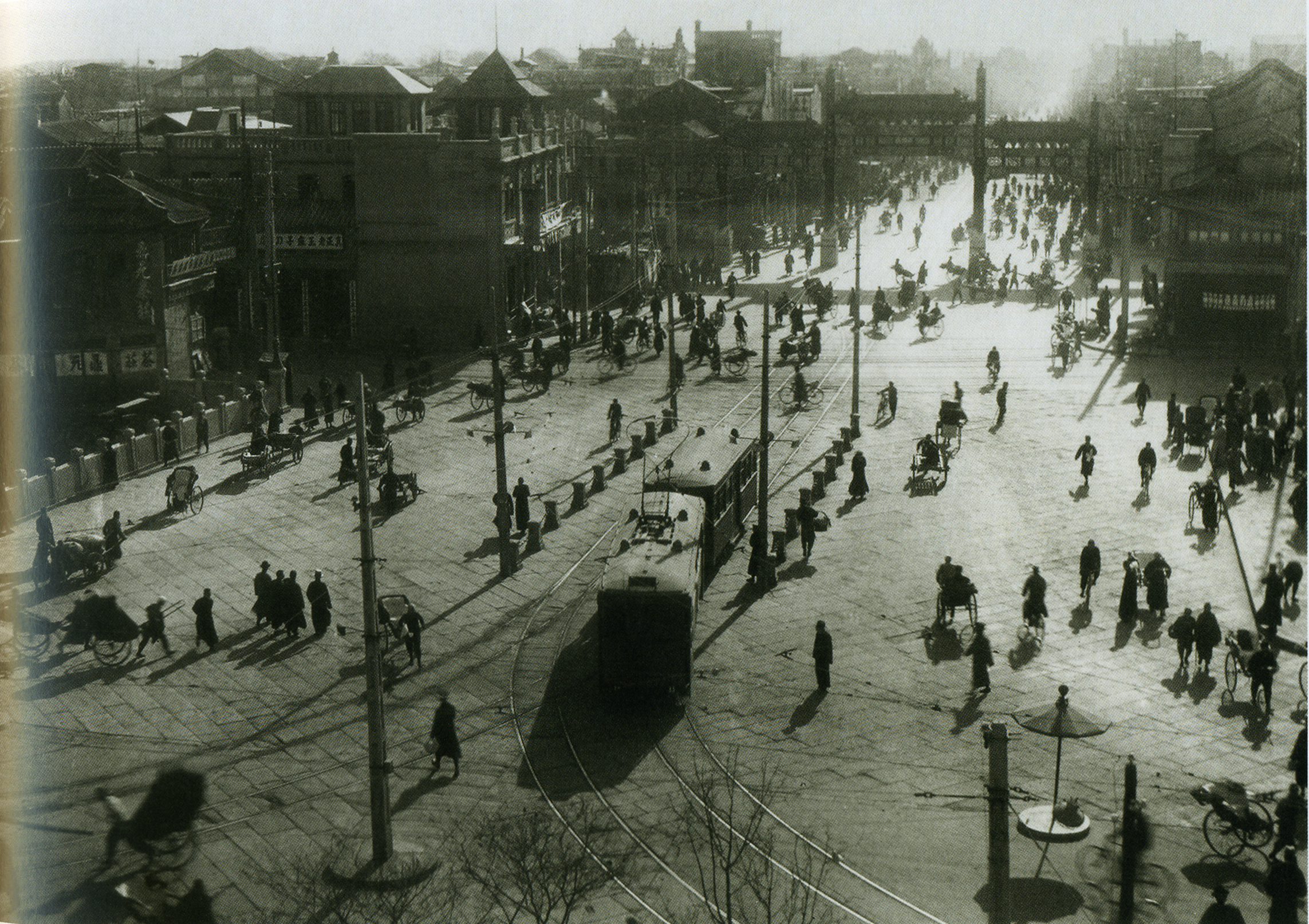
Street scene after the introduction of street trams in 1921. Rickshaws were also common.

=== City planning in the 1920s ===
During the Beiyang period, Beijing transitioned from an imperial capital into a modern city. The city's population grew from 725,235 in 1912 to 863,209 in 1921. The municipal government reconfigured city walls and gates, paved and widened streets, installed tram service and introduced urban planning and zoning rules. The authorities also built modern water utilities, improved urban sanitation, educated the public about the proper handling of food and waste and monitored outbreaks of infectious diseases. With these public health measures, infant mortality and life expectancy of the general population improved.

Urban development also reflected changes in political attitudes as the republican form of government prevailed over the monarchy and attempts to reintroduce imperial rule. One example of the newfound emphasis on civic rights over imperial tradition was the development of city parks in Beijing. The idea of the public park as a place where common people could relax in a pastoral setting came to China from the West via Japan. Public parks in Beijing were almost all converted from imperial gardens and temples, which had previously been off-limits to most commoners. The Beijing municipal government, local gentry and merchants all promoted the development of public parks to provide wholesome entertainment and reduce alcoholism, gambling, and prostitution. After the Beijing Coup of 1924, Feng Yuxiang evicted Puyi from the Forbidden City, which was opened to the public as the Palace Museum. Parks also provided places for commercial activities and the open exchange of political and social ideas for the middle and upper classes.

The demotion of Beijing from national capital to a mere provincial city greatly constrained urban planners' initiatives to modernize the city. Along with political stature, Beiping also lost government revenue, jobs and jurisdiction. In 1921, large banks headquartered in Beijing accounted for 51.9% of bank capital held by the 23 most important banks in China. That proportion fell to just 2.8% in 1928 and 0% in 1935, as wealth followed political power out of the city. The city's jurisdiction also shrank as surrounding counties were redrawn into Hebei. For the first time since the Ming dynasty, city no longer had control over agricultural regions and watershed. Even the power plant for the city's trolley system in Tong County fell outside the city's jurisdiction. Appeals to Nanjing for the recovery of towns like Wanping and Daxing were denied. The city, anchored by its historical relics and universities, remained a center for tourism and higher education and became known as "China's Boston." In 1935, the city's population stood at 1.11 million, with another 3.485 million in the surrounding region.

=== Second Sino-Japanese War ===
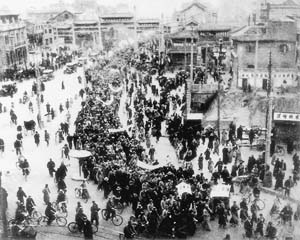
Students marched through Beiping on December 9, 1935 calling on the Nationalist Chinese government to resist Japanese expansion into northern China.

After Japan seized Manchuria through the Mukden Incident in 1931, Beiping was threatened by steady Japanese encroachment into northern China. The Tanggu Truce of 1933 gave control of the Great Wall to the Japanese and imposed a 100-km demilitarized zone south of the wall. This deprived Beiping of its northern defenses. The secret He-Umezu Agreement of May 1935 required the Chinese government to remove Central Army units from Hebei Province and suppress anti-Japanese activities by the Chinese public. The Qin-Doihara Agreement of June 1935 compelled the Nationalist 29th Army, a former unit of Feng Yuxiang's Guominjun that fought the Japanese in defense of the Great Wall, to evacuate from Chahar Province. This army was relocated and confined to an area south of the Beiping near Nanyuan. In November 1935, the Japanese created a puppet regime based in Tongzhou called the East Hebei Autonomous Council, which declared its independence from the Republic of China and controlled 22 counties east of Beiping, including Tongzhou and Pinggu in modern-day Beijing Municipality.

In response to the growing threat, the Palace Museum's art collection was removed to Nanjing in 1934 and air defense shelters were built in Zhongnanhai. The influx of refugees from Manchuria and presence of university campuses made Beiping a hotbed for anti-Japanese sentiment. On December 9, 1935, the university students in Beiping launched the December 9th Movement to protest the creation Hebei–Chahar Political Council, a semi-autonomous authority to administer the remainder of Hebei and Chahar not yet under direct Japanese control.

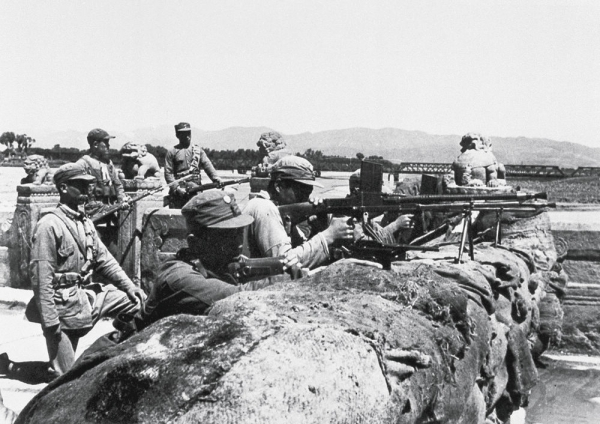
Above: Chinese soldiers defending the Marco Polo Bridge in July 1937. Right: Japanese magazine cover showing the Japanese military marching through the gate at Chaoyangmen on August 8, after the capture of Beiping. (Asahigraph, September 1, 1937, ed.)

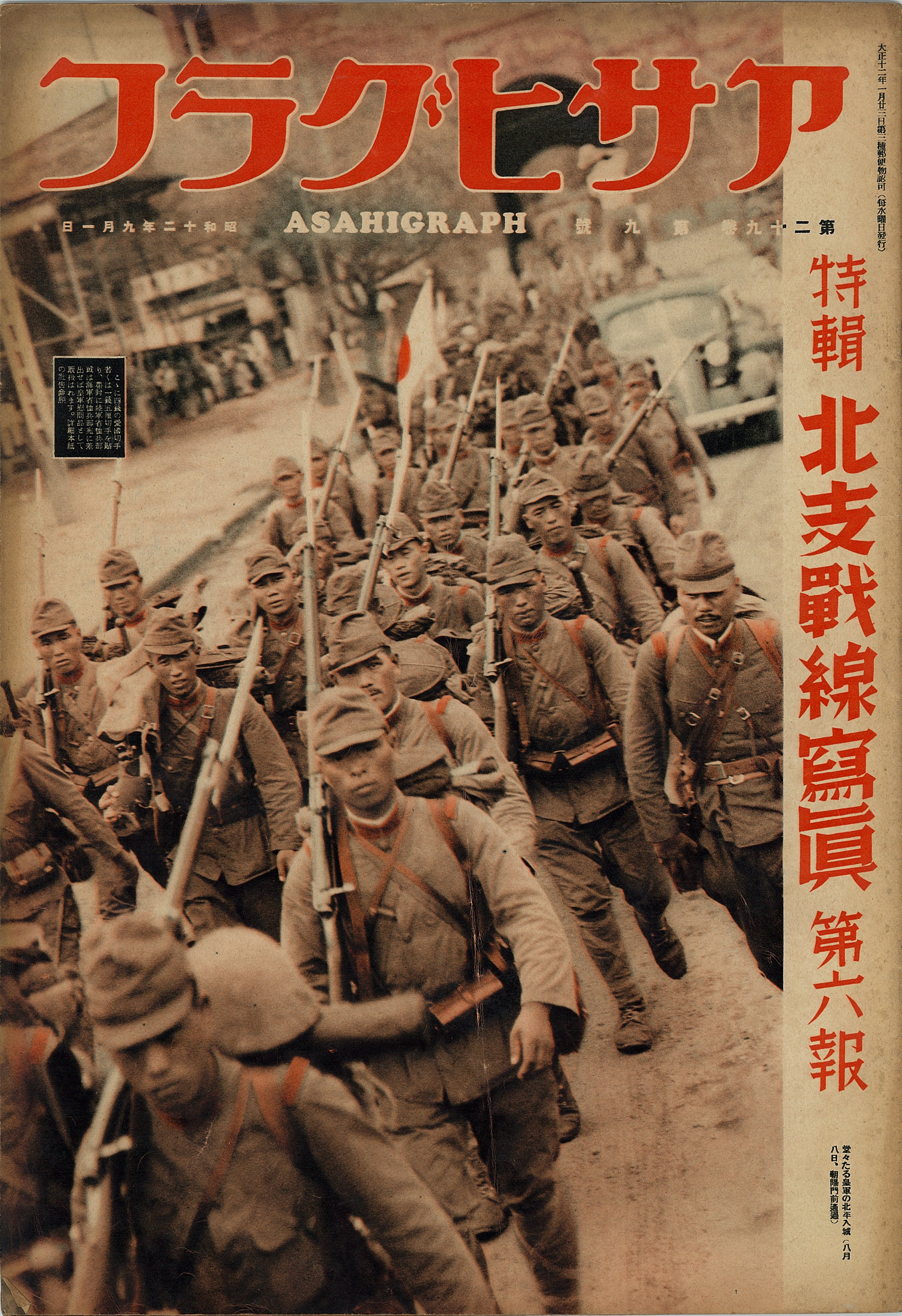

On July 7, 1937, the 29th Army and the Japanese army in China exchanged fire at the Marco Polo Bridge near the Wanping Fortress southwest of the city. The Marco Polo Bridge Incident triggered the Second Sino-Japanese War, World War II as it is known in China. After continued clashes and failed cease-fire talks, Japanese reinforcements with air support launched a full-scale offensive against Beiping and Tianjin in late July. In fighting south of the city, deputy commander of the 29th Army Tong Lin'ge and division commander Zhao Dengyu were both killed in action. They along with Zhang Zizhong, another 29th Army commander who died later in the war, are the only three modern personages after whom city streets are named in Beijing. (Note: Tong Linge Lu and Zhao Dengyu Lu in Xicheng District and Zhang Zizhong Lu in Dongcheng District, are the only streets named after modern personages in the city of Beijing. The three streets were named in 1946 after Nationalist generals who died defending the city and country in World War II. After taking the city in 1949, the Chinese Communists, who issued a policy against naming streets after personages to prevent the rise of the cult of personality, retained the street names. No other streets have since been named after people. Several hutongs in the city are named after personages from the city's more distant past. Wenchengxiang Hutong near the shrine of Wen Tianxiang is named after the Song dynasty prime minister. Guangningbo Jie is named after the Duke of Guangning, Liu Jiang (renamed by the Yongle Emperor to Liu Rong), who defeated Japanese pirates in the 15th century. Liusulan Hutong is named after Liu Lan, a famous Yuan dynasty sculptor.) In Tongzhou, the collaborationist militia of the East Hebei Council refused to join the Japanese in attacking the 29th Army and mutinied, but Chinese forces had retreated to the south. The city itself was spared of urban fighting and destruction that many other Chinese cities suffered in the war.

The Japanese created another puppet regime, the Provisional Government of the Republic of China, to manage occupied territories in northern China and designated Beiping, renamed Beijing, as its capital. This government later merged with Wang Jingwei's Reorganized National Government of China, a collaborationist government based in Nanjing, though effective control remained with the Japanese military.

During the war, Peking and Tsinghua Universities relocated to unoccupied areas and formed the National Southwestern Associated University. Furen University was protected by the Holy See's neutrality with the Axis Powers. After the outbreak of the Pacific War with the Japanese attack on Pearl Harbor in December 1941, the Japanese shut down Yenching University and imprisoned its American staff. Some were rescued by Communist partisans that waged guerrilla warfare in rural outlying areas. The village of Jiaozhuanghu in Shunyi District still has a labyrinth of tunnels with underground command posts, meeting rooms, and camouflaged entrances from the war.

In 1938, the Japanese military secretly created North China Unit 1855, a biological warfare unit based in Beijing, which operated laboratories next to the Temple of Heaven, Beihai and in the Union Hospital. Like Unit 731, its more notorious counterpart, Unit 1855 devised virulent strains of bacteria and conducted lethal experiments on prisoners of war. Strains of infectious diseases developed by Unit 1855 were used about 70 times during the war, killing over 100,000 civilians in northern China. In 1943, a strain of cholera released by the unit in southern Beijing to test its virulence killed 1,872 residents. Biological warfare was banned by the Geneva Protocol of 1925. On August 15, 1945, immediately following the Japanese Emperor's announcement of surrender, Unit 1855 began removing or destroying evidence of its existence and departed the city ten days later leaving few traces of its activities. The unit evaded the Japanese war crimes tribunals and remained largely unknown until later research by historians.

On October 10, 1945, Japanese occupation of Beiping ended with surrender to Chinese Nationalist forces at a ceremony in the Forbidden City. With the end of World War II, the city reverted to Chinese Nationalist control and was renamed back to Beiping.

=== Chinese Civil War ===
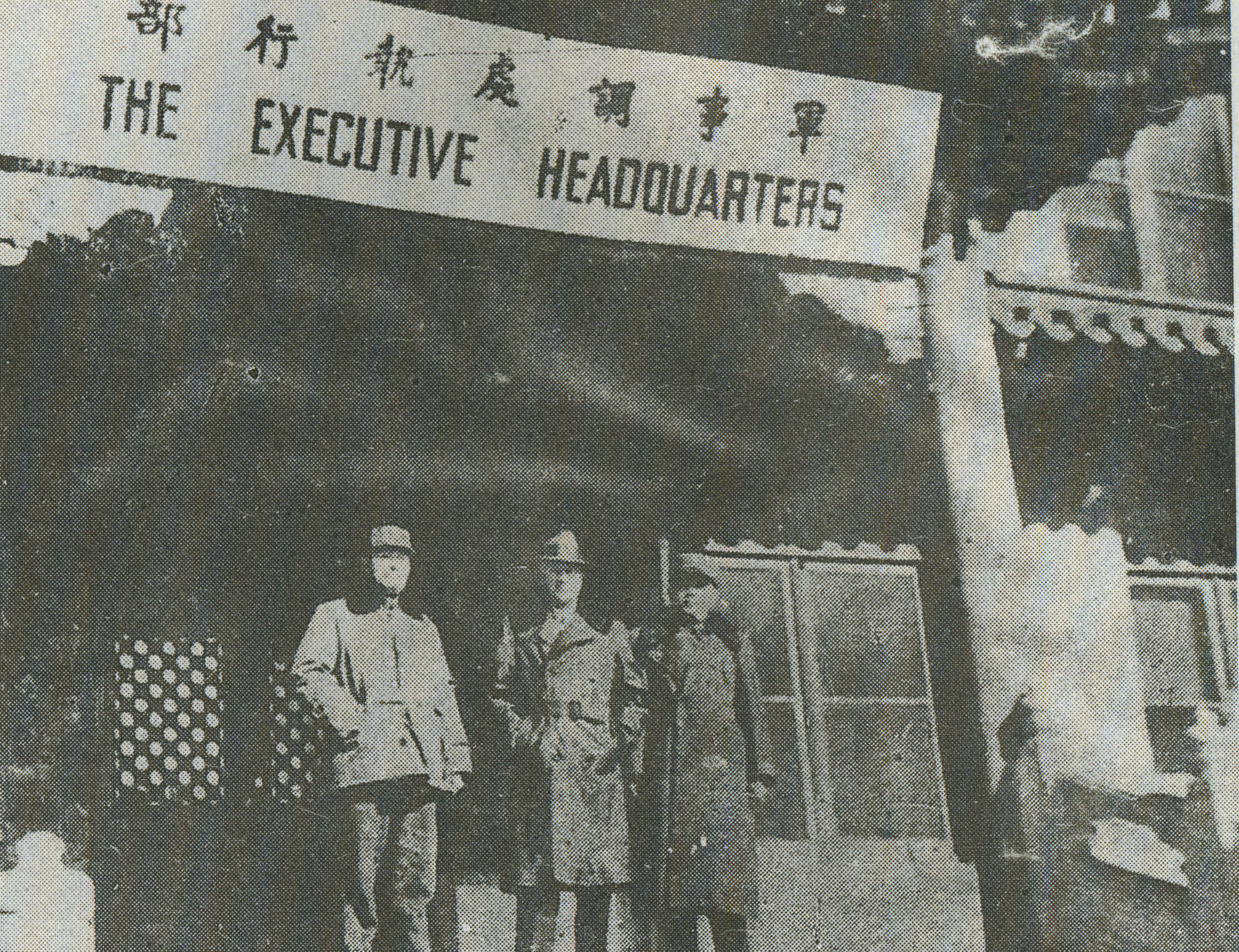
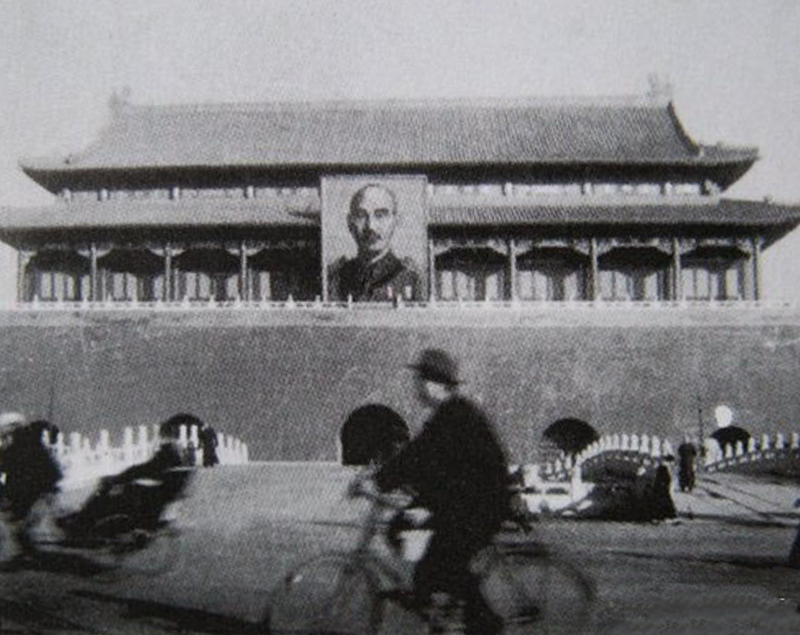
Left:The Executive Headquarters of U.S. General George C. Marshall's Mission to China (1945–1947) near the Peking Union Medical College in Beiping with a "Committee of Three" to mediate disputes between the Chinese Nationalists and Communists. The mission brokered a truce in 1946 and but failed to create a coalition government and prevent the outbreak of civil war. Right: A large portrait of Chiang Kai-shek was displayed above Tiananmen Gate during the Civil War.
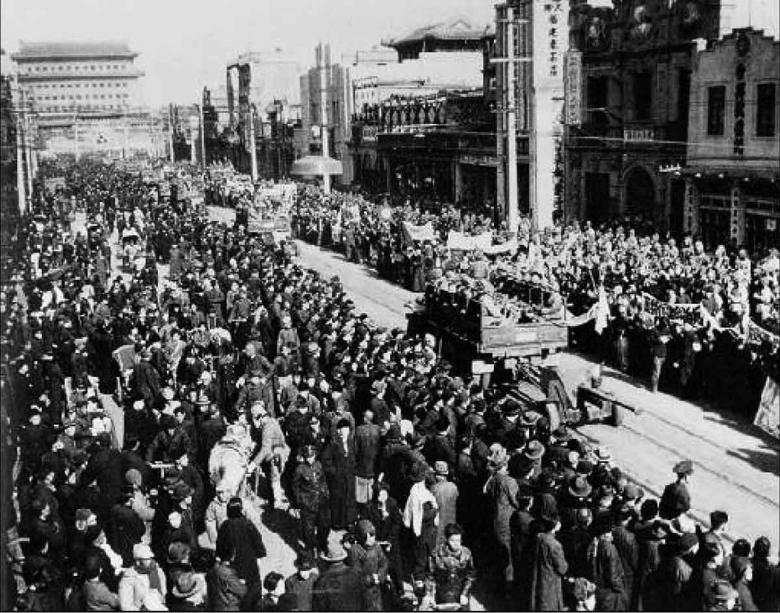
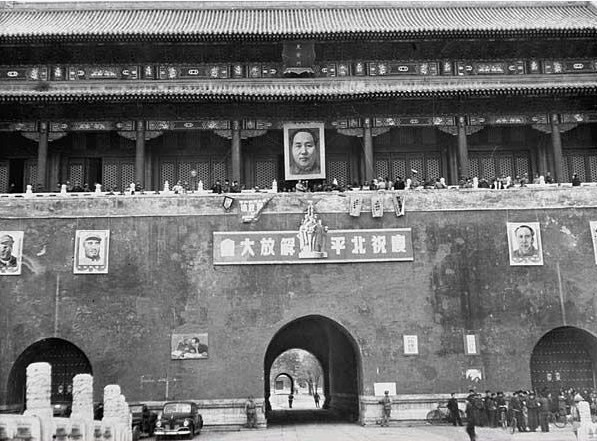
Left: After Nationalist Commander Fu Zuoyi agreed to hand over Beiping without a fight, the People's Liberation Army entered the city on February 3, 1949. Pictured is the military procession toward Qianmen. Right: The portrait of Mao Zedong on Tiananmen Gate on February 12, 1949.

The Nationalists and Chinese Communists were allies during the Sino-Japanese War, but their domestic rivalry resumed after the defeat of Japan. To prevent the resumption of civil war, the U.S. government sent George C. Marshall to China to mediate. The Marshall Mission was headquartered in Beiping where a truce was brokered on January 10, 1946, and a three-person committee, consisting of a Nationalist, a Communist and an American representative, was created to investigate breaches in the ceasefire in North China and Manchuria. The truce began to unravel in June 1946 and the Marshall Mission ultimately failed to create a coalition government. The rape of Peking University student Shen Chong by two U.S. Marines in Dongdan on Christmas Eve 1946 sparked student demonstrations against the U.S. military presence in China. After Marshall's departure in February 1947, full-scale civil war erupted.

Beiping was the headquarters of the Nationalists' North China military operations led by Fu Zuoyi who commanded 550,000 troops. The city in 1948 had 1.5 million residents and another 4.1 million in the surrounding region. Among them were over 20,000 student airlifted out of Manchuria by Nationalist authorities to relieve pressure on food supplies in besieged cities and to prevent the youth from joining the Communist movement. Once in Beiping, the student refugees were given meager food rations but no means of reconstituting their schools. Once their rations ran out, the students marched on the city government in protest but were fired upon by the Nationalists' Youth Army, which killed at least nine and wounded 48. The July 5th Massacre was widely condemned across the country. Then vice-president Li Zongren and Fu Zuoyi met with students and promising to hold the culprits accountable. Chiang Kai-shek agreed to pull the Youth Army out of Beiping, but over 250 student organizers were arrested in August.

On November 29, 1948, the Chinese Communists' People's Liberation Army (PLA), fresh off a decisive victory in Manchuria, launched the Pingjin Campaign. They captured Zhangjiakou to the northwest on December 24 and Tianjin to the southeast on January 15, 1949. With the defeat of the Nationalists in the Huaihai Campaign further south, Fu Zuoyi and over 200,000 Nationalist defenders were surrounded in Beiping. After weeks of intensive negotiations, Fu agreed on January 22, 1949, to pull his troops out of the city for "reorganization by the PLA." His defection spared the city, its residents and its historical architecture from imminent destruction. On February 3, the PLA marched into Beiping.

In the spring of 1949, Nationalist leader Li Zongren attempted a last-ditch effort to secure a truce. Peace talks were held at the Six Nations Hotel in Beiping from April 1–12, but the Communists could not be persuaded to halt their advance at the Yangtze River and concede southern China to the Nationalists. On April 23, the PLA resumed the offensive across the Yangtze and captured the Nanjing on the following day.

As the PLA continued to gain control over the rest of the country, Communist leaders, friendly Nationalists and third party supporters convened the Chinese People's Political Consultative Conference at Zhongnanhai in Beiping on September 21. In preparation for establishment of a new regime, they agreed to a new name, flag, emblem, anthem and capital for the nation.

== People's Republic of China ==
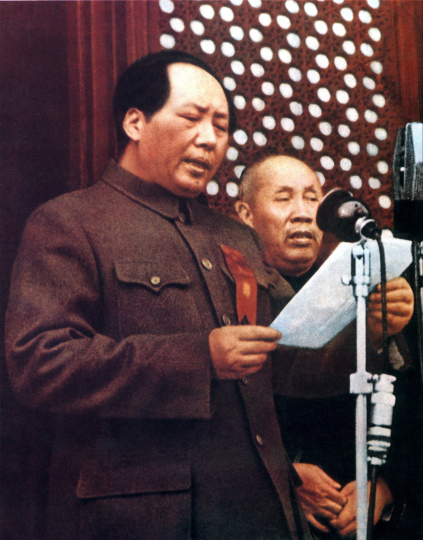
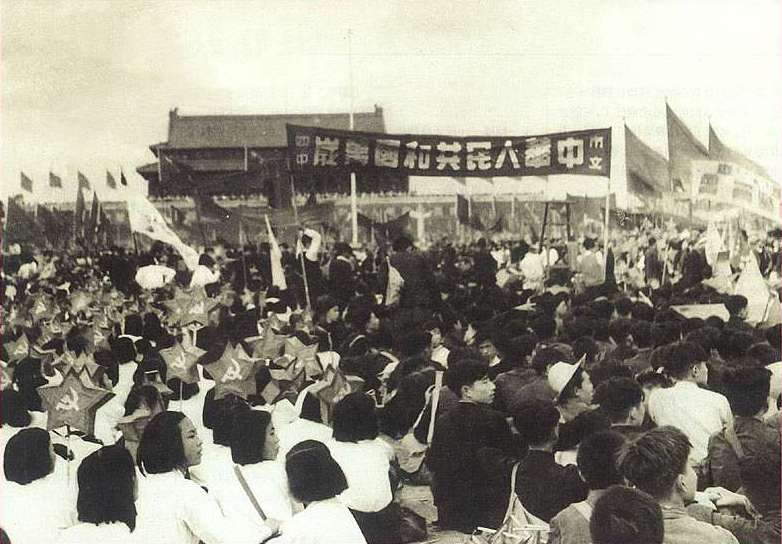
Left:From atop Tiananmen Gate, Mao Zedong, proclaimed the founding of the People's Republic of China on October 1, 1949, and Beijing again became the capital of China. Right: Beijing middle school students attended the ceremony in Tiananmen Square.

On October 1, 1949, Mao Zedong stood atop the rostrum of Tiananmen Gate, proclaimed the founding of the People's Republic of China. The city's name was restored to Beijing, which again served as the national capital. At the time, the city limits contained 707 km^{2} (273 sq mi) of territory and had just over 2.03 million residents. Over the next sixty years, the city would reach unprecedented size in both territory (expanding 23-fold) and population (growing ten-fold) as well as political stature and importance. As the political center of a highly centralized government, Beijing witnessed and its residents took part in many of the political events and developments that shaped modern China.

=== 1949–1958 ===
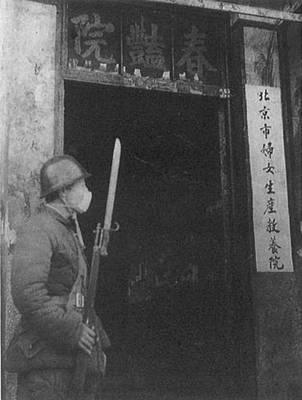
After prostitution was banned in Beijing in 1949, former brothels were converted into centers for women's production and education, where former prostitutes received reeducation, career training and medical treatment. At the time, over 90% of prostitutes in Beijing had venereal diseases.

Socialist-realist architecture from the 1950s

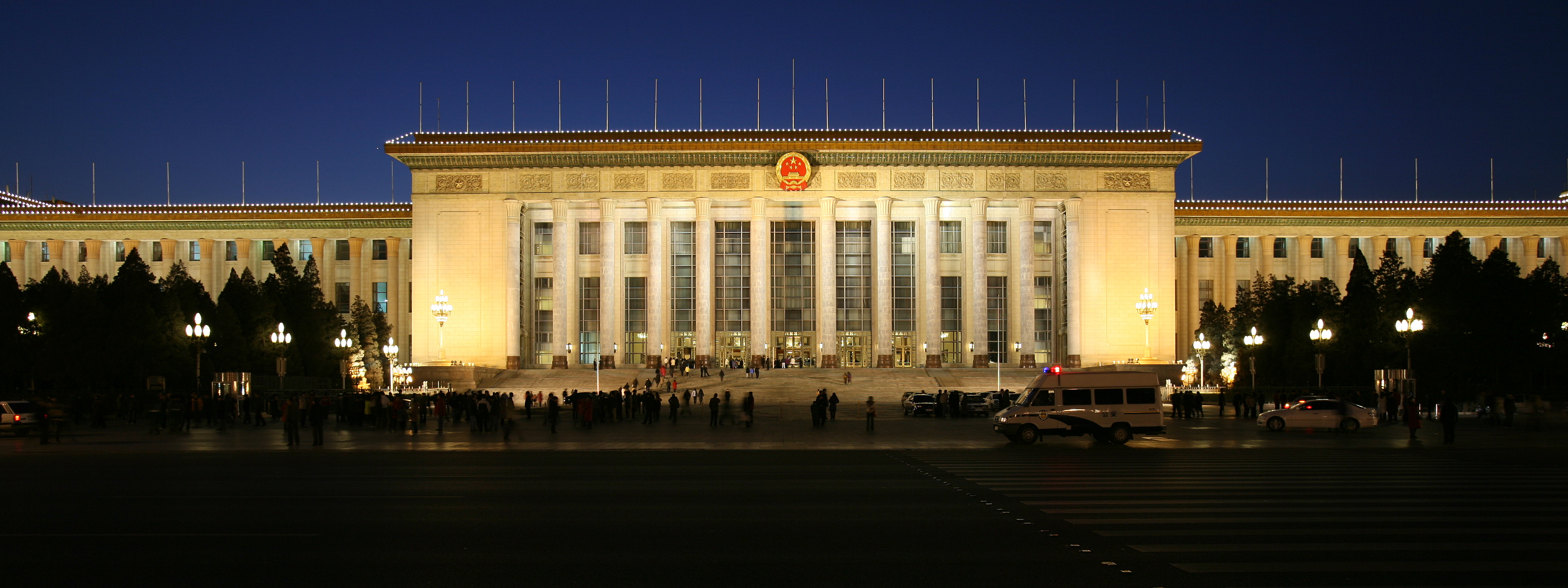
Great Hall of the People

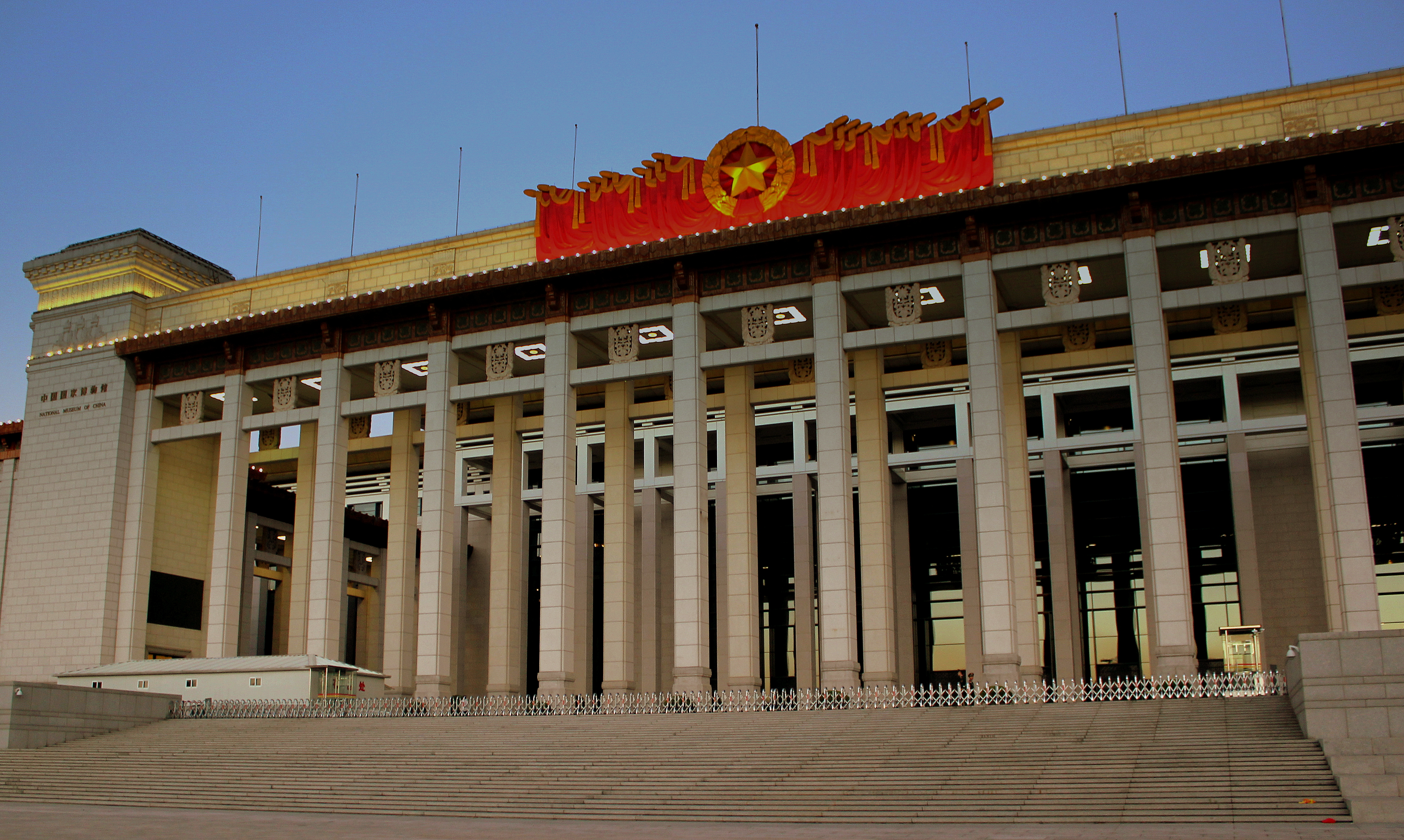
National Museum of China

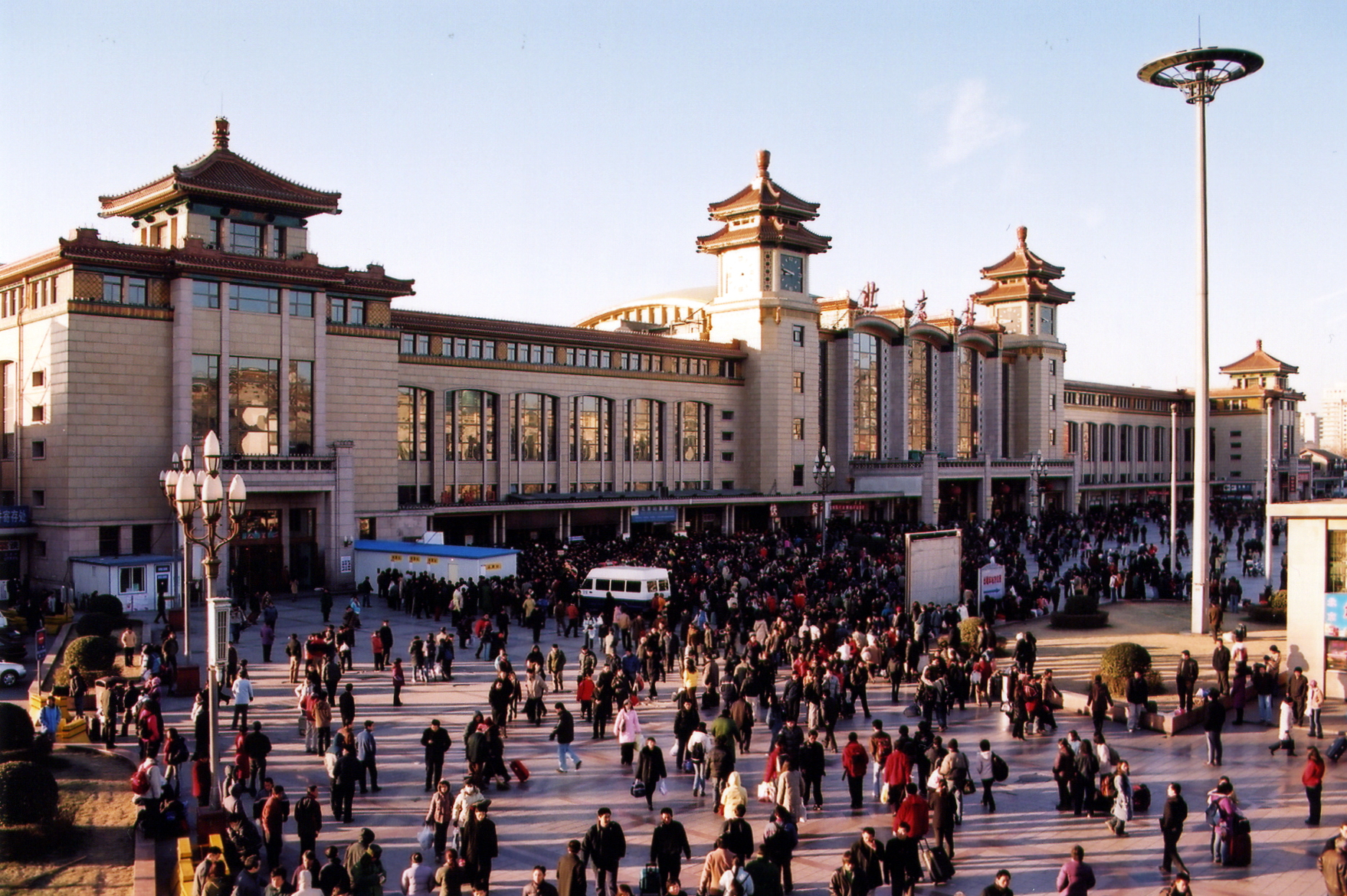
Beijing railway station

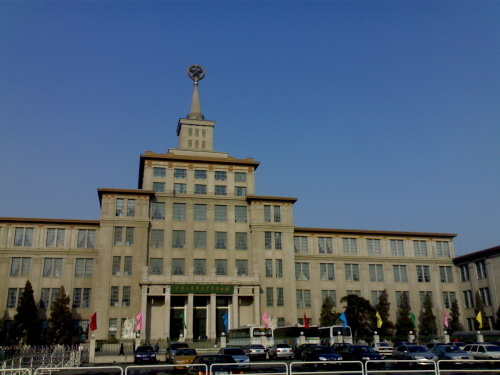
Beijing Military Museum

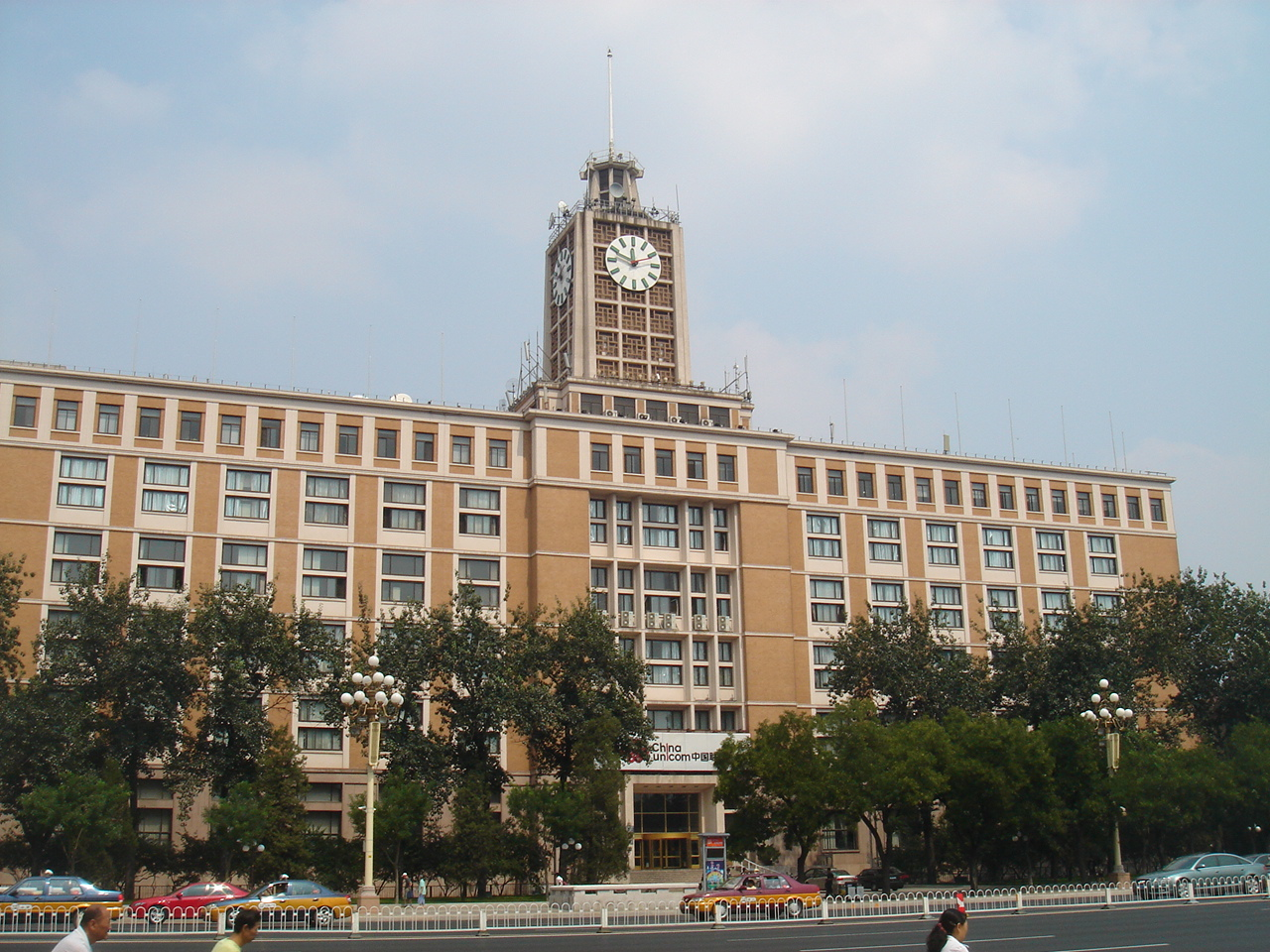
Xidan Telecom Building

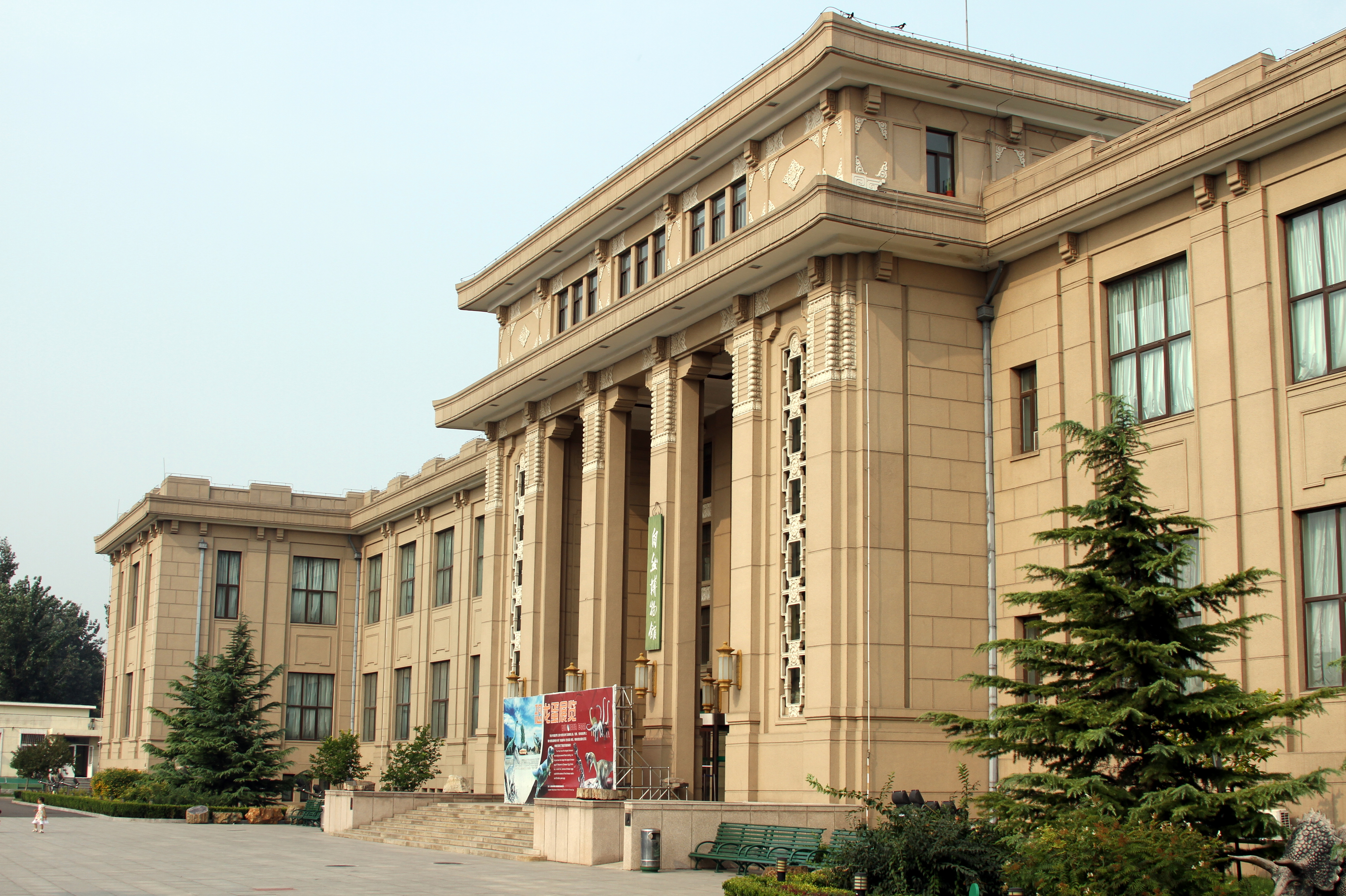
Beijing Museum of Natural History

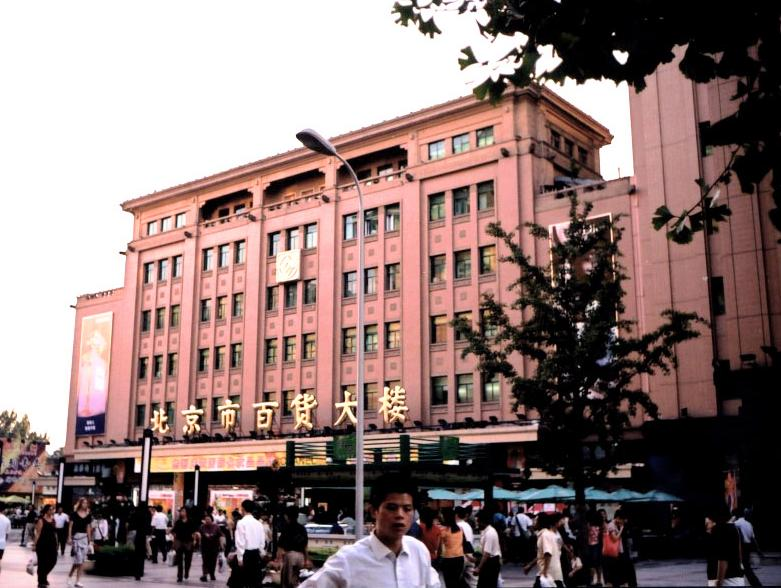
Wangfujing Department Store

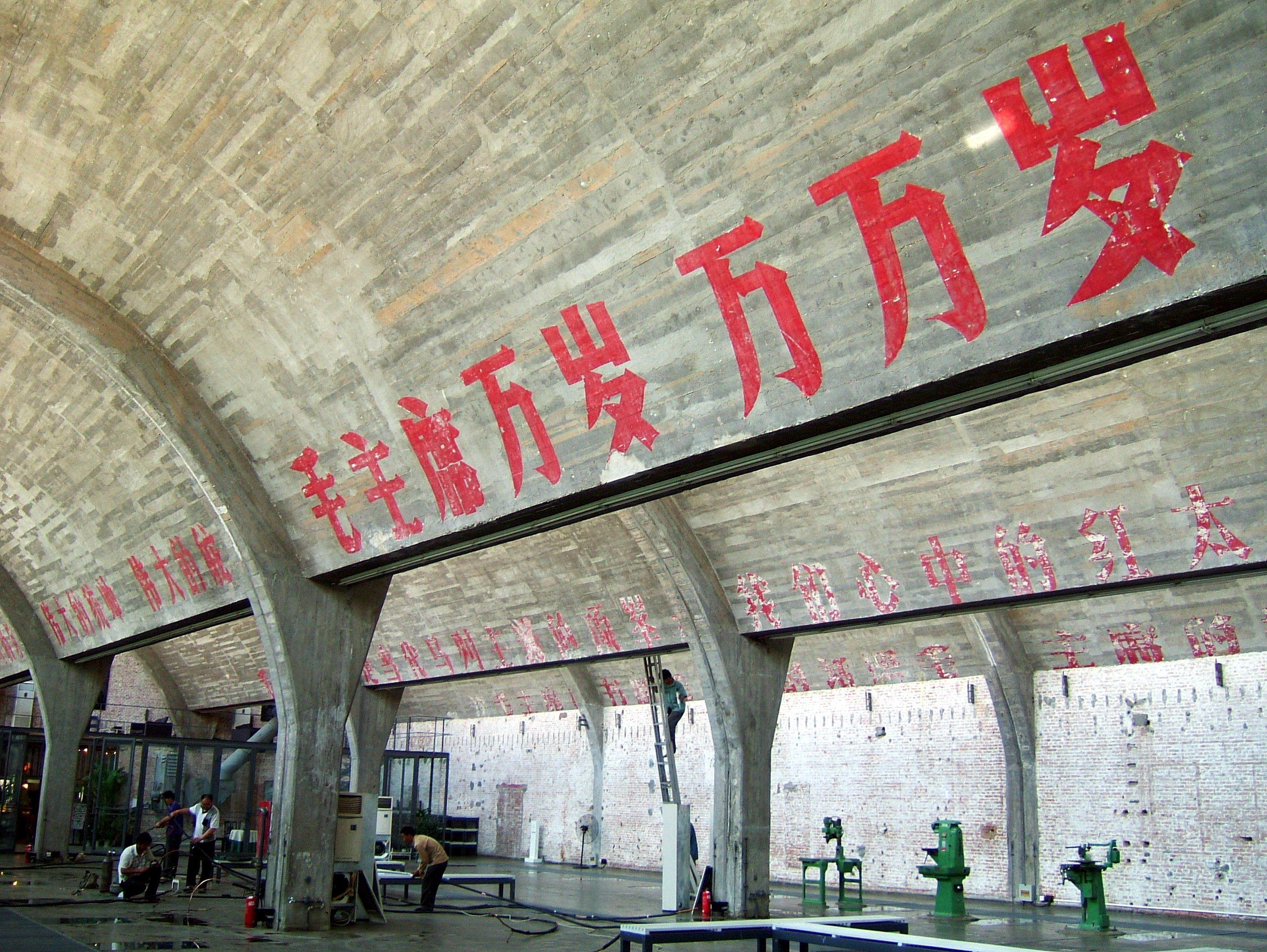
Mao-era slogans adorn the walls of Plant No. 798, built in 1952 with East German assistance. In 2002, the plant's bauhaus-style warehouses were converted into 798 Art Zone, a modern art community.

The Communist leadership moved swiftly to establish a new order in Beijing. Within weeks of the founding of the new government, prostitution was banned in the city. Some 224 brothels were closed and 1,308 prostitutes were sent to reeducation centers where they received medical treatment and career retraining. Opium use was banned in 1952.

With the abolition of the unequal treaties, the foreign powers were deprived of special rights to station military units and consular offices in the Legation Quarter. The United States, France and Netherlands, which refused to recognize the new government, were forced to abandon their consulates and military offices by 1950. The Soviet Union negotiated a move to a new embassy in the northeast corner of the old city. The United Kingdom, which recognized the PRC, was among the last countries to leave the legation quarters in 1954. A new embassy district emerged east of the city walls in Sanlitun where allies in the Eastern Bloc and Third World opened diplomatic missions.

As the seat of power for the People's Republic, Beijing was transformed to reflect the ideals of socialist state. At a planning conference in November 1949, chaired by mayor Nie Rongzhen, renowned architect Liang Sicheng proposed to preserve the architectural integrity of the old walled city by building a new urban area and government center in Wukesong, Sanlihe, and Diaoyutai 10 km (6.2 mi) west of Tiananmen. Advisors from the Soviet Union countered with a proposal to concentrate new government buildings in the old urban core especially around Tiananmen Square. Building in the old city would enable government employees to reside in existing city neighborhoods as adding new residential units to accommodate a new government center in the suburbs was deemed uneconomical. The Soviet advisors also called for the city to industrialize, noting that workers accounted for only four percent of the local population and that the capital of a Communist government ought to have a strong proletarian class. The Soviet proposals largely prevailed and guided Beijing's urban planning for the next decade.

Tiananmen Square was expanded to accommodate large public rallies and parades. Landmark buildings and monuments, influenced by the socialist-realist style from the Soviet Union, including the Monument to the People's Heroes, Great Hall of the People, and the National Museum of China, were completed by 1959, in time for the 10th anniversary of the founding of the People's Republic. Many neighborhoods in the old city were razed to make room for factories, government bureaus and apartment buildings. Many palaces and gardens were converted to residences, schools and offices. Large factories were built in the western and eastern suburbs. The national leadership took residence in the Zhongnanhai, to the west of the Forbidden City, where the Ming dynasty royal garden and palace stood. The city wall fell into disrepair and was demolished in the 1960s during the construction of the Beijing Subway and replaced by what is now the 2nd Ring Road.

During the Korean War, Beijing hosted the Asia and Pacific Rim Peace Conference, the city's first major international gathering. The conference, organized by Mme. Sun Yat-sen, Guo Moruo and Peng Zhen and held at the Peace Hotel on October 2–12, 1952, was attended by over 400 delegates from 37 countries. The newly developed residential neighborhood of Hepingli, or Place of Peace, was named after the conference.

The city became the most concentrated center for higher education and academic research in China. Though foreign-funded universities were closed or converted to public institutions—Yenching University merged into Peking University, which moved from the city centre to the Yenching campus in the northwest suburbs and Fu Jen Catholic University merged into Beijing Normal University—the number of universities in Beijing swelled with the relocation of institutions from guerilla areas such as Renmin University, BIT, Central Party School, Central Nationalities Institute, and Beijing Foreign Studies University, and the opening of national academies and institutes by various ministries.

From 1949 to 1958, the city steadily acquired land from neighboring Hebei Province. The last major additions occurred in 1958 with the incorporation of nine counties: Tong County (now Tongzhou District), Shunyi, Daxing, Liangxiang (now part of Fangshan District), Fangshan, Pinggu, Miyun, Huairou and Yanqing, adding 11,988 km^{2} (4,629 sq mi) for a total of 16,800 km^{2} (6,500 sq mi). In 1958, the municipal population reached 6,318,497, of which 31.5% resided in the walled city, 29% in the immediate suburbs and the remainder in outlying towns and rural areas. City planners set a target population of 10 million for Beijing.

Industrialization of Beijing in the 1950s-1960s

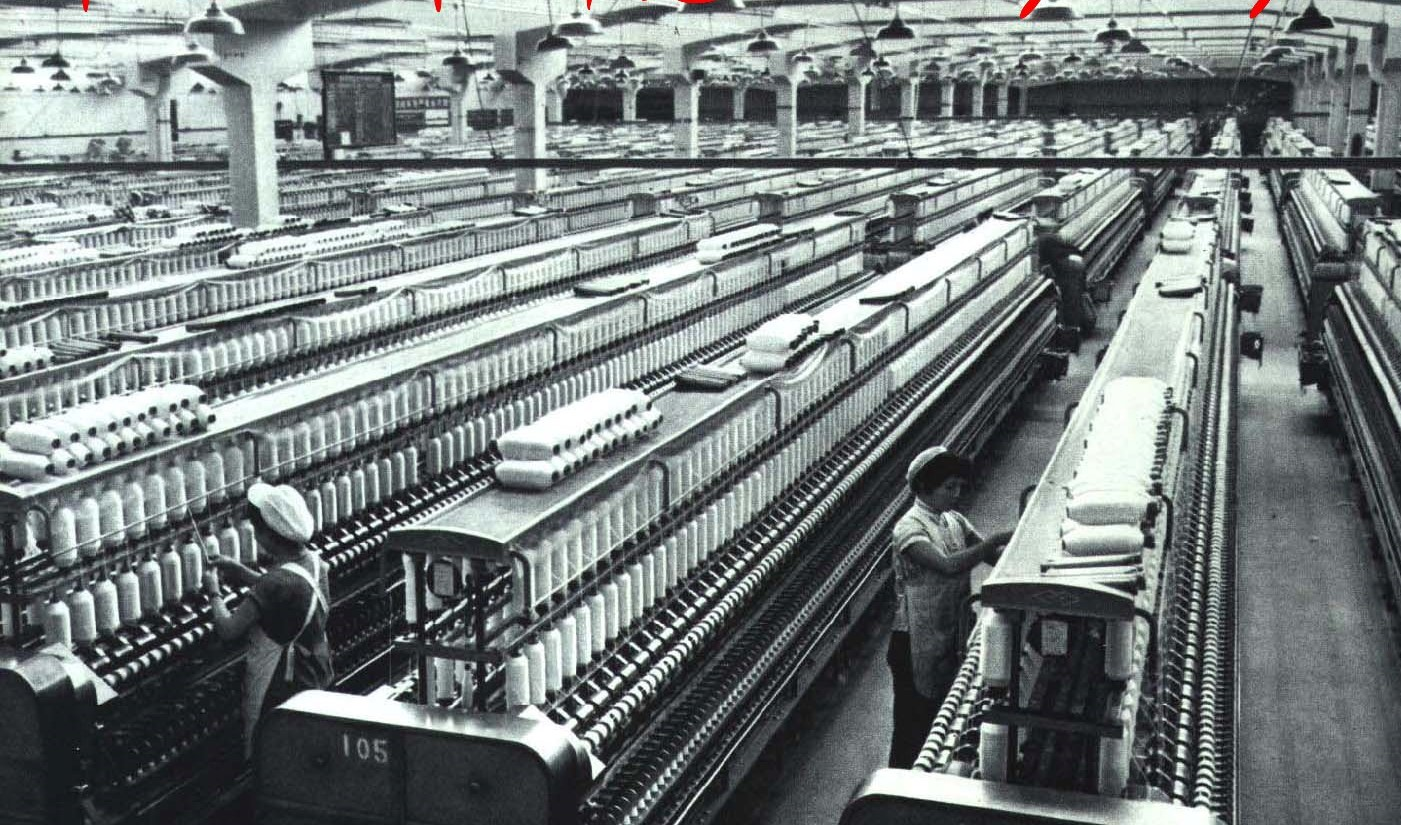
Beijing No. 2 Cotton Mill

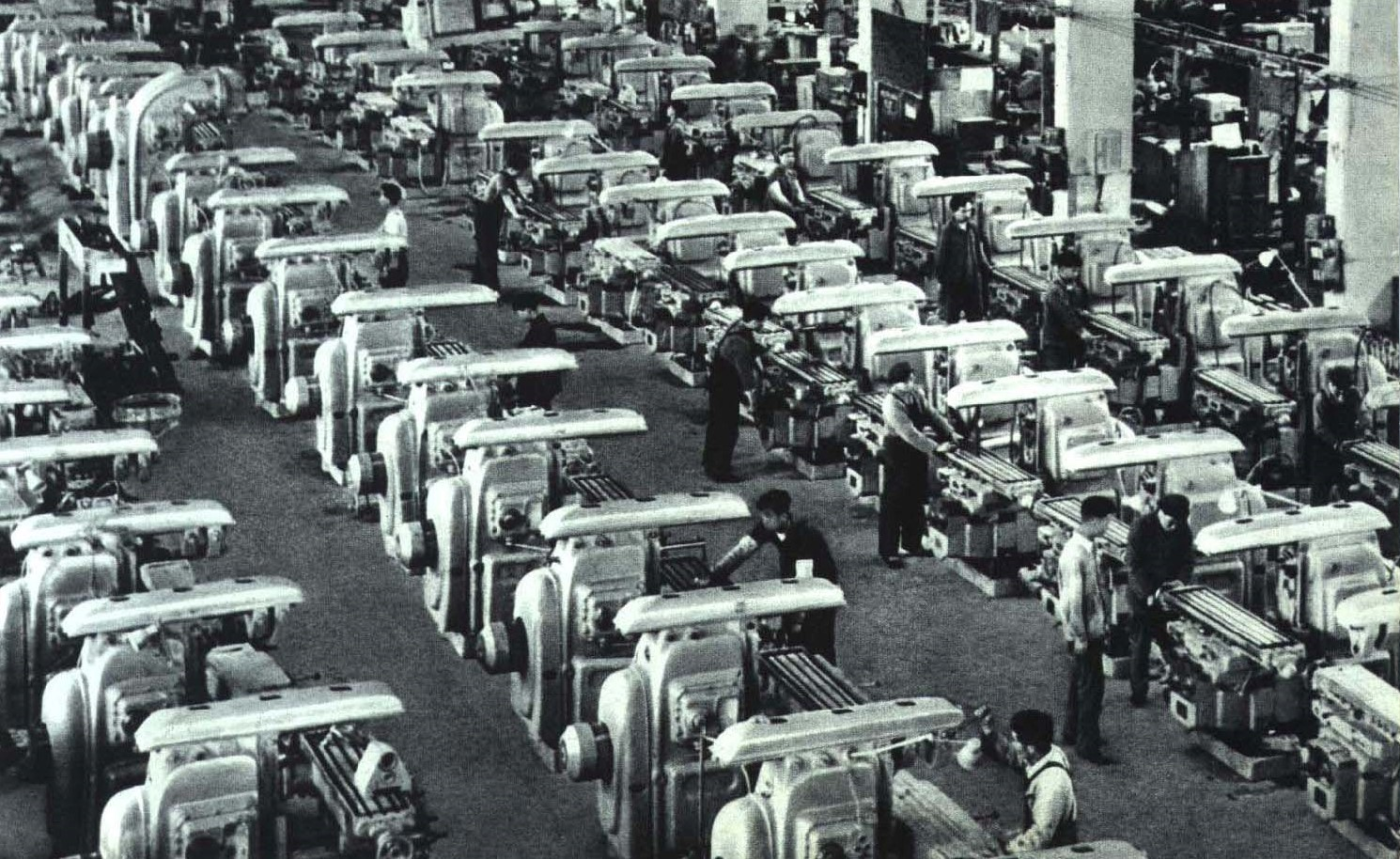
Beijing No. 1 Machinery Factory

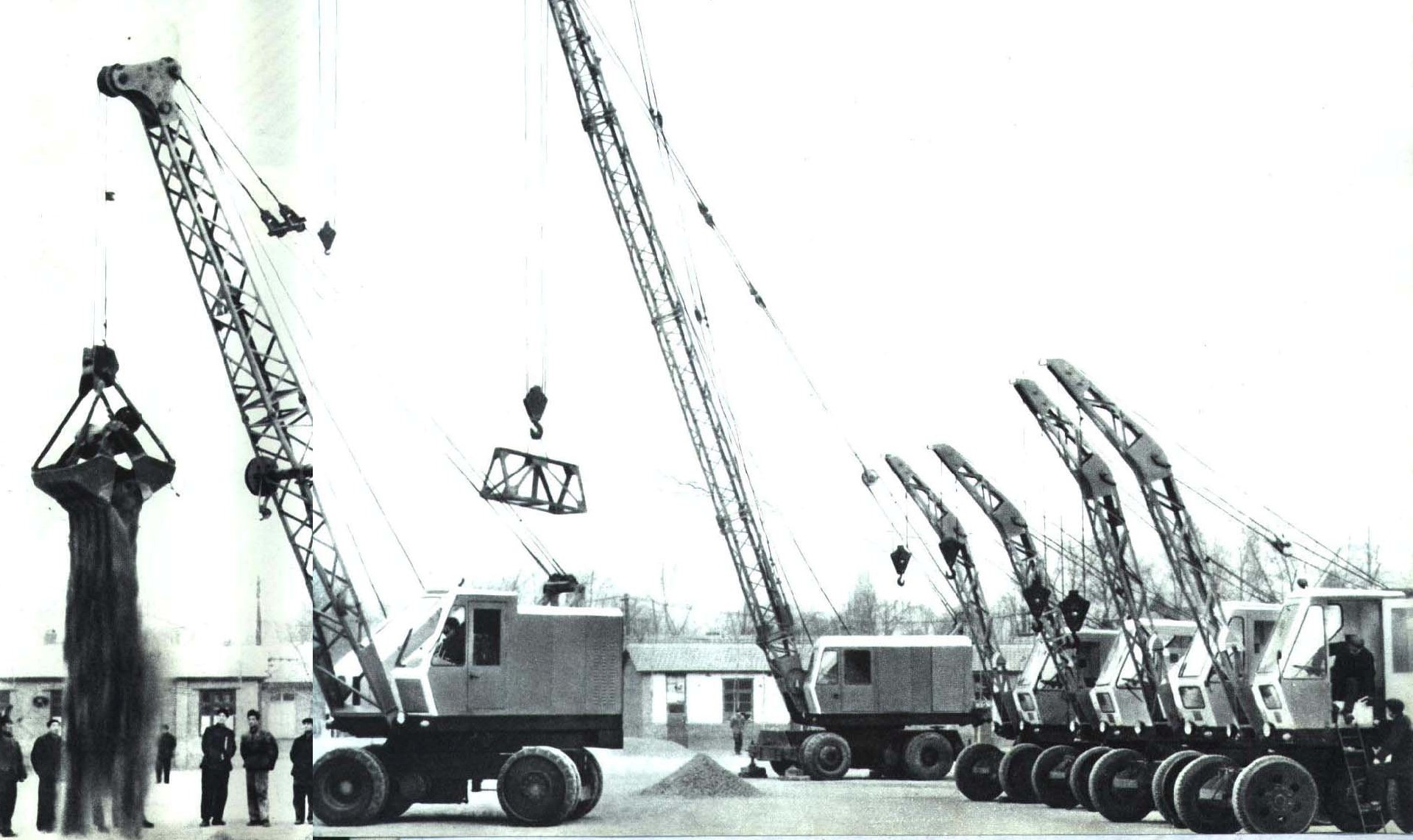
Beijing Heavy Machinery Plant

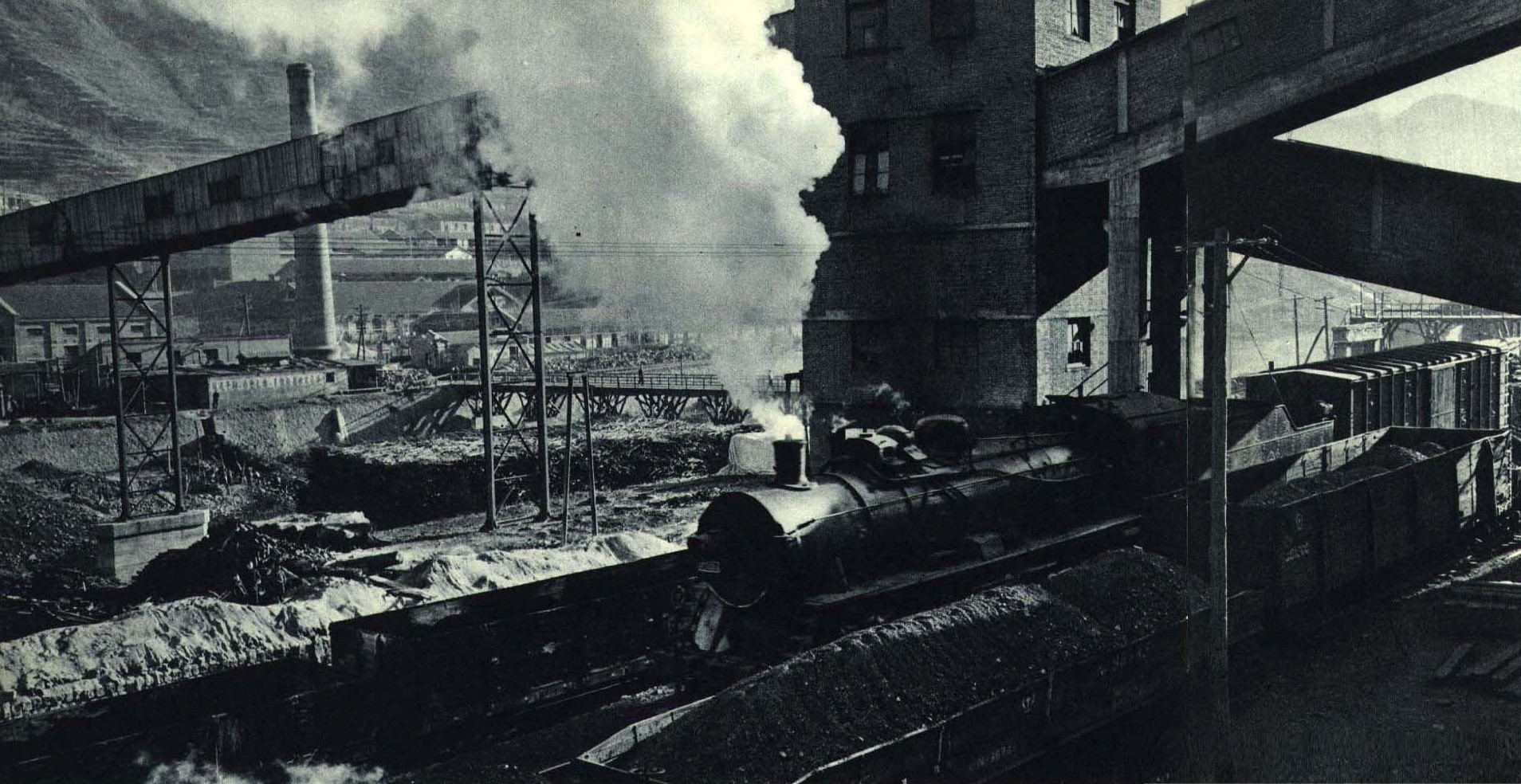
Jingxi Coal Mine in the Western Hills

All photos from China Pictorial

=== Great Leap Forward ===
In January 1958, Mao kicked off the second Five Year Plan with an ambitious campaign to accelerate economic development. The Great Leap Forward sought to overcome China's shortage of capital through mass mobilization, using large-scale collectivized farms to boost agricultural output and the food surplus to free up labor for industrial development. In urban Beijing, as in other cities, new apartment buildings were constructed without kitchens. Instead, residents dined in communal mess halls, which served free meals. Residents were mobilized to produce steel in homemade backyard furnaces using personal metal possessions (such as pots and cutlery, which they were presumed to no longer need as cooking was done centrally by the mess halls). The campaign hastened the demolition of city walls, whose bricks were used to build the furnaces. The low grade pig iron produced from these furnaces were ill-suited for industrial use. The policy was a complete failure and the misallocation of resources halted the city's reconstruction plans for years.

Documentary film of daily life in Beijing in 1958. Part 1 of CIA film on the Great Leap Forward

Among the most quixotic features early in the campaign was the effort to exterminate the Four Pests, including sparrows, which were blamed for eating grain. At the height of this effort in April 1958, over three million residents using fire crackers, gongs, clanging pots and colorful flags, literally deprived sparrows (and other birds) a place to land in the city so that the birds flew until they dropped dead from fatigue. Over 400,000 sparrows (and countless other birds) were killed over a three-day period. The campaign was halted after the eradication of sparrows led to a spike in the locust population.

Throughout the summer and fall of 1958 the quality and quantity of food served at communal mess halls steadily declined, and mess halls were shut down altogether in early 1959. Residents instead received food ration tickets (15–17 kilos of grain per month for each man, 13.75 kg for each woman, 12.75 kg for young adults, 3.75 kg for children under age 10). Due to bullish grain production forecast, winter wheat was not planted in 1958 leaving no harvest in the spring of 1959. By May 1959, residents were forced to supplement their meager diet with elm bark, reed roots, willow shoots, wild amaranth, wild celery and other edible wild plants. Malnutrition became widespread in the city. Some 420,000 residents were sent to the countryside because the city could no longer support them. The food shortage caused the rate of "deaths from non-natural causes" in the Beijing to climb from 3.64% of the total population in 1958 to 4.4% in 1961, an increase of 90,000 deaths. The famine was far more severe in other provinces where the unnatural death rate in 1960 was as high as 13.8% in Anhui and 9.08% in Sichuan.

Mao initially clung to the Great Leap Forward, firing defense minister Peng Dehuai for objecting to the policy line at the Lushan Plenum in 1959. But as the scale of the disaster became more apparent, an extraordinary work conference for cadres from around the country was hastily convened in Beijing in early 1962. At the so-called 7,000 Cadre Conference held from January 11 to February 7, President Liu Shaoqi and Deng Xiaoping reported the severe decline in the economy and called for urgent course correction, citing numerous policy failures. Mao acknowledged that mistakes were made and the need for cadres to vent. Only Lin Biao, the new defense minister, prominently defended Chairman Mao. Liu and Deng's policy arguments drew extensively on research prepared by the Beijing Municipal Government and provided by mayor Peng Zhen. The conference paved the way for economic recovery led by Liu and Deng but also planted the seeds for the Cultural Revolution.

=== Cultural Revolution ===
The Great Proletariat Cultural Revolution, Chairman Mao's campaign to change the social and cultural fabric of Chinese society, was launched from and ultimately halted in Beijing, with profound consequences for the city and country.

Mao initiated the campaign by directing attacks against political-literary figures in Beijing. The first target was Wu Han, the deputy mayor of Beijing and historian, whose book Hai Rui Dismissed from Office, adapted from a Peking opera about an incorruptible Ming-era official, had been praised by Mao in the early 1960s. But on November 10, 1965, the work was criticized by Shanghai propagandist Yao Wenyuan as an attempt to rehabilitate Peng Dehuai. Yao was supported by Mao's wife Jiang Qing. The scope of attack then expanded to the "Three Family Village", so-named for a column in the People's Daily jointly written by Wu Han, Deng Tuo, the editor of the newspaper, and Liao Mosha, another Beijing literary figure and official. The trio was accused of making veiled attacks against Maoism. Deng Tuo committed suicide and Wu Han later died in prison. Their fall implicated the mayor of Beijing, Peng Zhen, who was accused of running the city government as his fiefdom and harboring anti-party conspirators. The attack on Peng Zhen, in turn, undermined the standing of Liu Shaoqi, an ally of Peng and Mao's ultimate target. The Beijing Municipal Government became the first casualty of the revolution; its leaders were replaced with radical Maoists.

Red Guards in Beijing during the Cultural Revolution
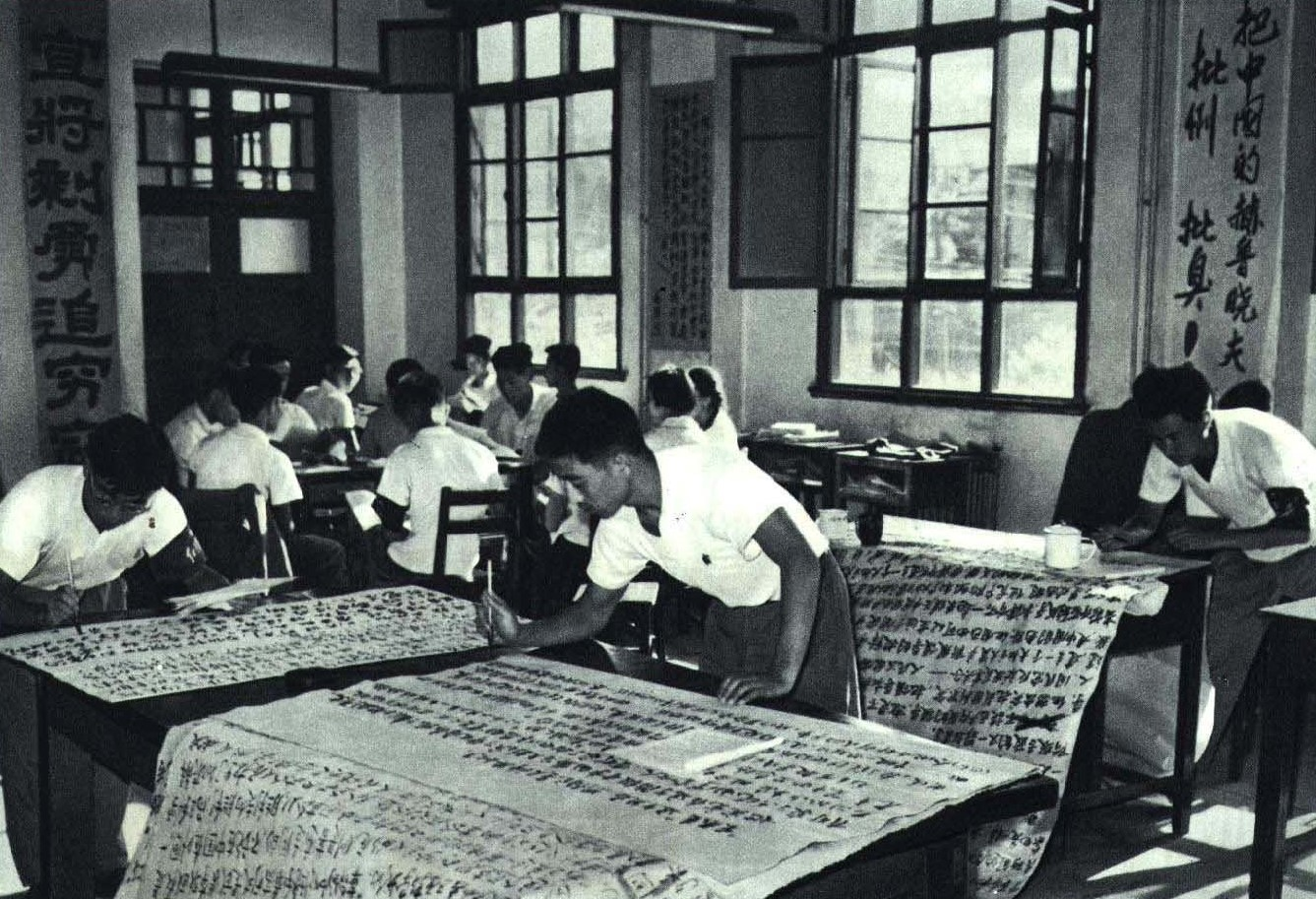
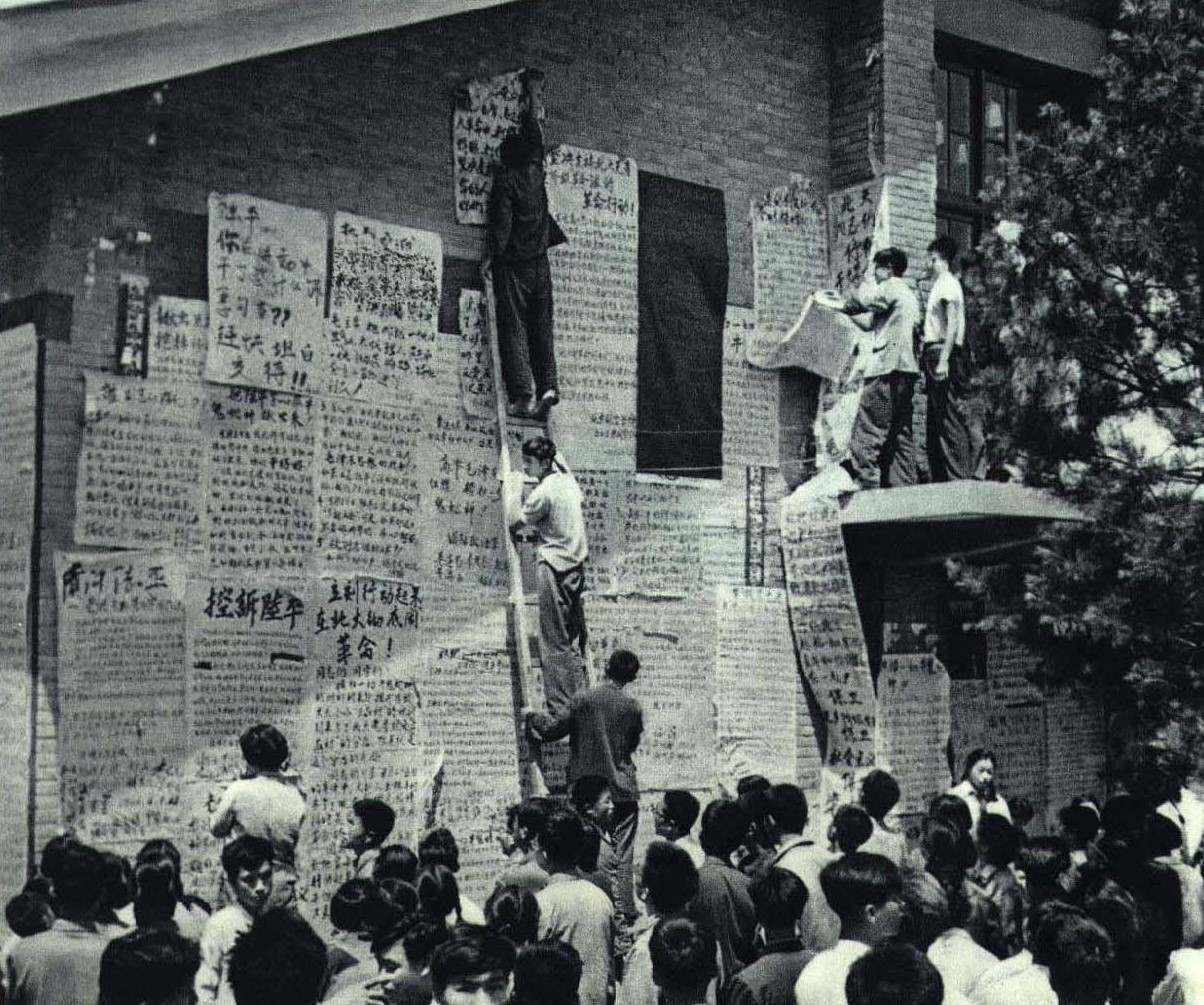
From left: (1) Students at Beijing Normal University writing big-character posters denouncing Liu Shaoqi; (2) Big-characters posted on the campus of Peking University; (3) Red guards at No. 23 Middle School wave the Little Red Book of the Quotations of Chairman Mao in a classroom revolution rally. All photos from China Pictorial

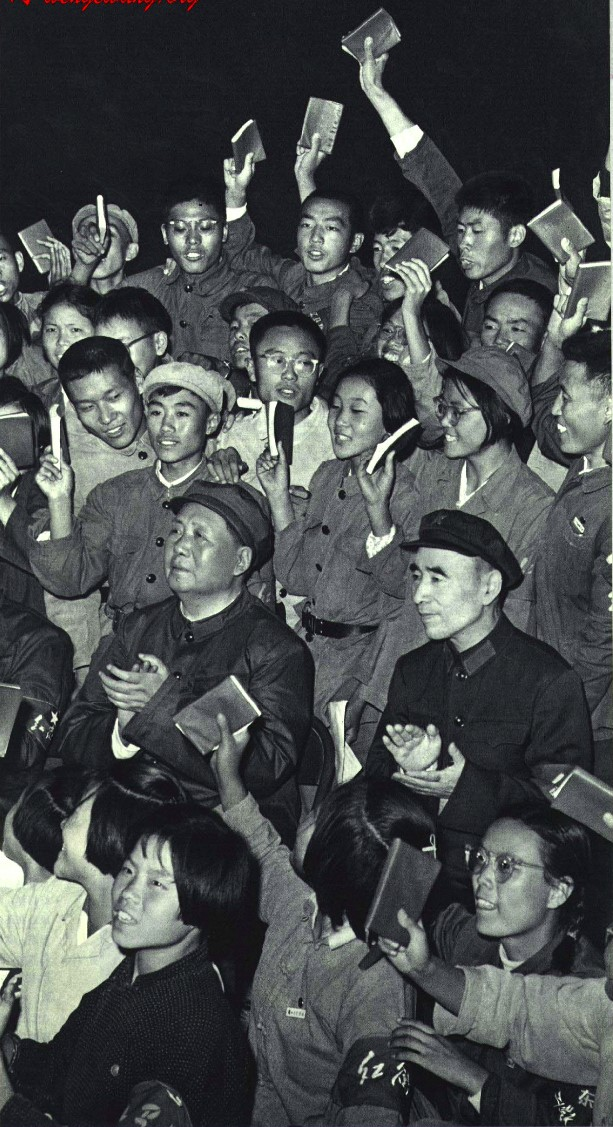
Mao Zedong and Lin Biao surrounded by rallying Red Guards in Beijing. Source: China Pictorial

As Mao expanded the power struggle at the elite level in the spring of 1966, he encouraged youth from Beijing's universities and high school to join his campaign. On May 16, 1966, Mao unveiled the "May 16 Circular", which officially launched a Cultural Revolution to cleanse the party and country of bourgeois and Soviet revisionist elements such as Peng Zhen. On May 25, 1966, several junior faculty at Peking University led by Nie Yuanzi, wrote a "big-character poster" accusing the school administrators of obstructing the Cultural Revolution and calling on the masses to destroy counter revolutionary and pro-Khrushchev elements. Nie was initially rebuked by the university but her poster was published nationally with Mao's blessing in the People's Daily on June 2 . On June 18, Peking University students held the first struggle session denouncing their teachers. Jiang Qing visited campus to lend her support to the rebellions students. By July 29, classes at all universities and high schools in the city were halted as students mobilized to join the Cultural Revolution. On May 29, a group of students at Tsinghua University Middle School, organized the first "Red Guard" group to protect Chairman Mao from the enemies of the revolution. Students at other Beijing schools followed. In August, Mao praised the Red Guards and called on them to "bombard the headquarters" of bourgeois elements in government. The movement spread and Mao ordered that the Red Guards be given free rides on trains and room and board across the country to spread the revolution. From August 18 to November 26, he presided over eight Red Guard rallies in Tiananmen Square attended by over 11 million youth. The rallies helped drive Liu Shaoqi from power.

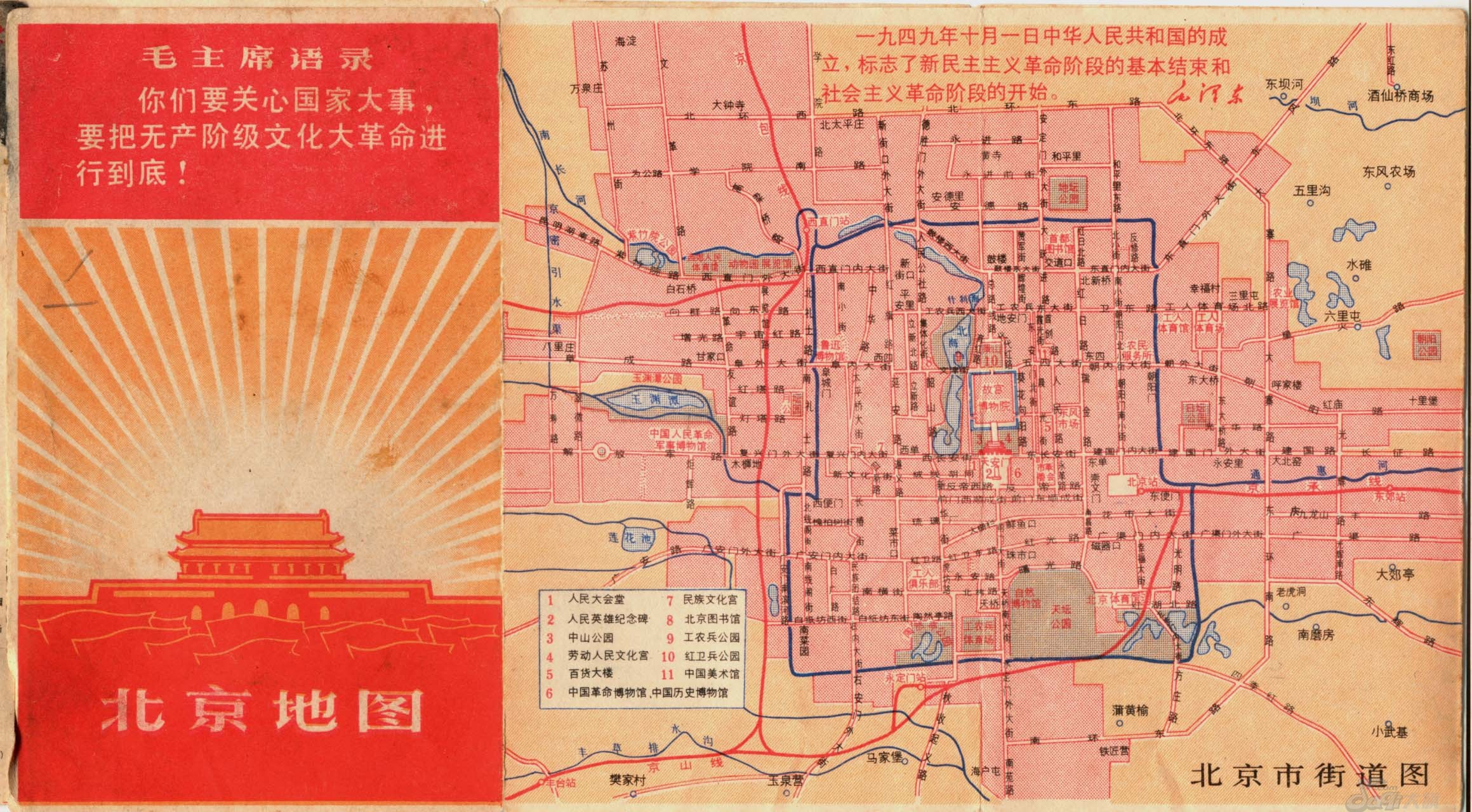
A 1968 city map showing streets and landmarks renamed during the Cultural Revolution. For example, Andingmen Inner Street became "Great Leap Forward Road"; Taijichang Street became the "Road for Eternal Revolution"; Dongjiaominxiang, the main street of the former Legation Quarter, was renamed "Anti-Imperialist Road"; Beihai Park was renamed "Worker-Peasant-Soldier Park" and Jingshan Park became "Red Guard Park". Most of the Cultural Revolution-era name changes were later reversed.

Having halted classes and toppled school administrations, the Red Guards then turned to enemies of the revolution in broader society. They ransacked homes of class enemies in search of incriminating evidence, smashed cultural relics deemed to be remnants of feudal culture, and struggled against political and cultural luminaries who were accused of following the capitalist road. Within one month of Mao's first rally on August 18, they ransacked 114,000 homes in the city, seizing 3.3 million items and ¥75.2 million in cash. During the height of the Red Guard fervor in August and September, at least 1,772 residents were killed. Many were driven to suicide or beaten to death by the Red Guards. Notable Beijing residents who took their own lives include deputy mayor Liu Ren, renowned writer Lao She and table tennis star and coach Rong Guotuan. Countless others suffered public humiliation, beatings and extrajudicial detentions at the hands of Red Guards and rebels. Many historical sites, including those designated by the city's historical protection bureau, were damaged or destroyed in the mayhem. Landmarks such as the Temple of Heaven, Beihai, Old and New Summer Palaces, Ming Tombs, Yonghe Lamsery and the Great Wall were also targeted. Almost all houses of worship were shut down. The Forbidden City was protected on the orders of Premier Zhou Enlai. Many city streets were renamed after revolutionary slogans. The Red Guards sought to rename the city itself as East is Red City.

By 1967, with schools closed and authority figures toppled, Red Guard factions began to compete with each other for control of institutions they had seized. The clashes grew violent, and some groups turned to challenge Jiang Qing. In 1968, Mao ordered the military to take control of government, universities and factories and had the Red Guards disband and leave the city for the countryside where they would "undergo reeducation from the peasants". Hundreds of thousands of educated youth from Beijing were sent to rural and pastoralist areas.

The Cultural Revolution exacerbated tensions with the Soviet Union and some 300,000 city residents were mobilized to build elaborate underground bunkers designed to shelter up to 40% of the city's population in the event of a nuclear attack. Beijing's Underground City, built from 1969 to 1979, was later converted to underground shopping centers and a museum.

At the Ninth Party Congress held in Beijing in April 1969, Mao declared the Cultural Revolution completed and named Lin Biao as successor. But on September 13, 1971, Lin died in a plane crash as he tried to flee to the U.S.S.R. following an unsuccessful coup plot against Mao. After Lin's death, colleges were reopened to "Worker-Peasant-Soldier students" and some of the purged old guard leaders such as Deng Xiaoping were partially rehabilitated, but radical Gang of Four, led by Jiang Qing, continued to hold sway.

Beijing at the time of the Nixon visit in 1972
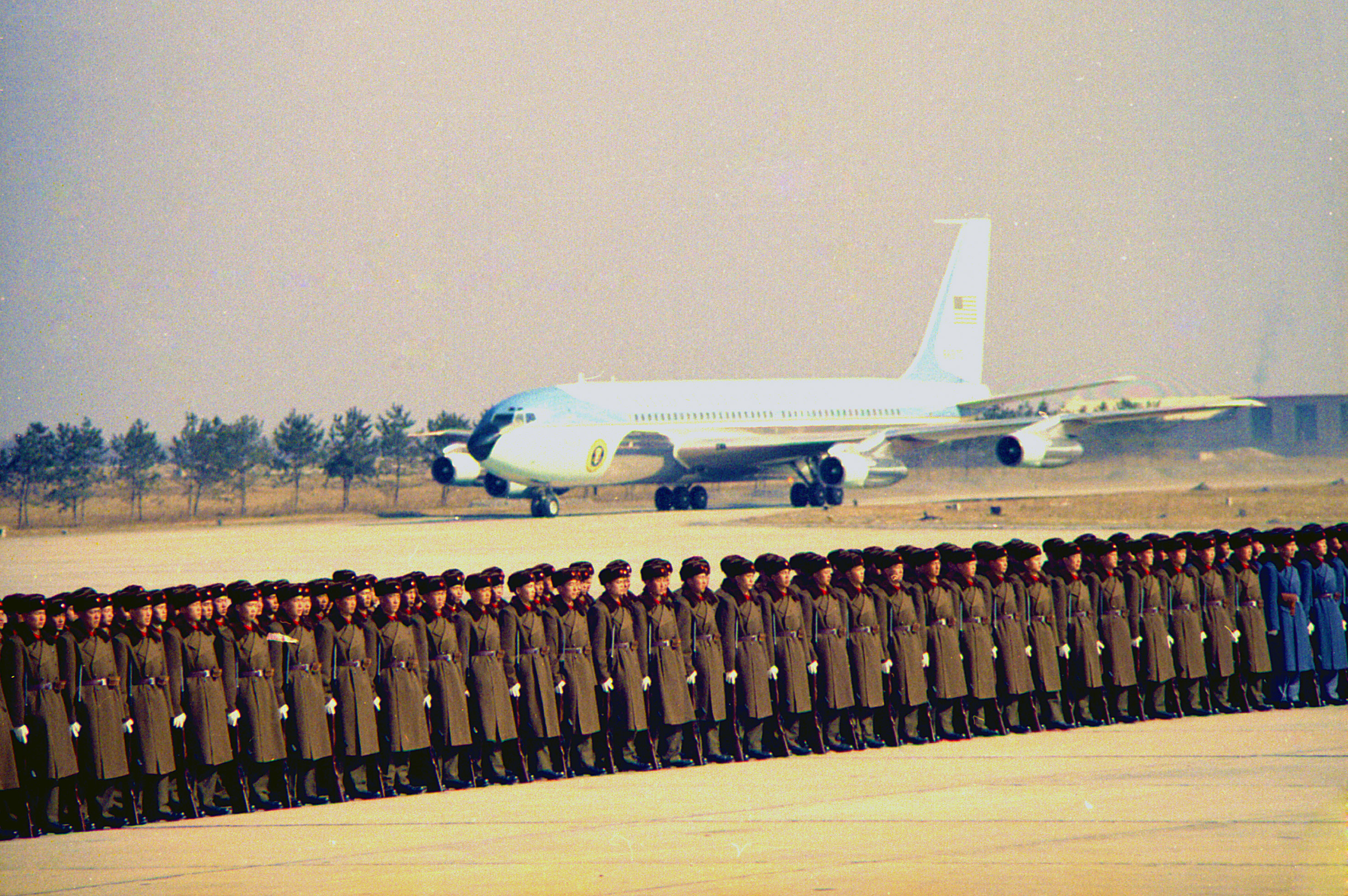
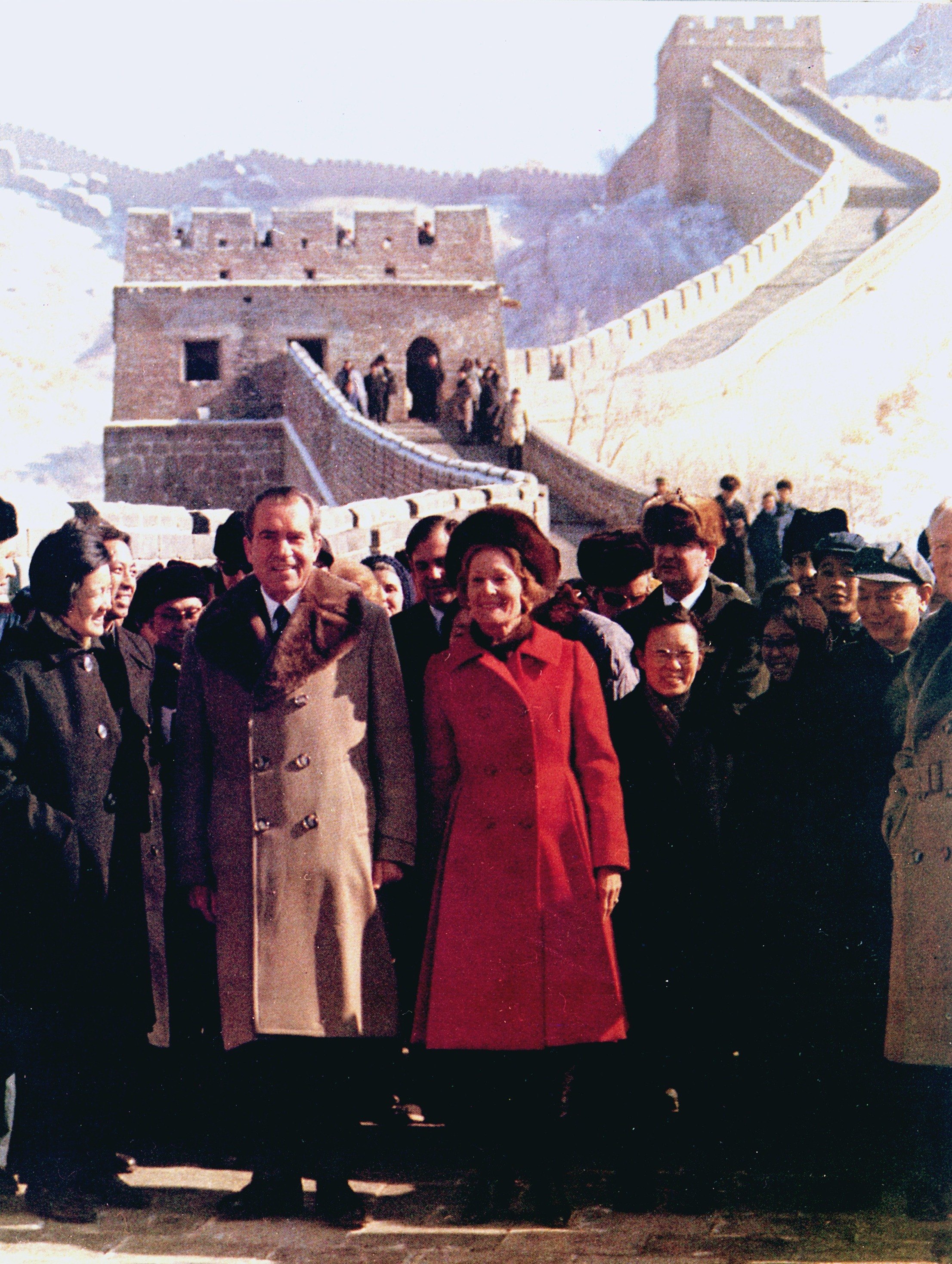
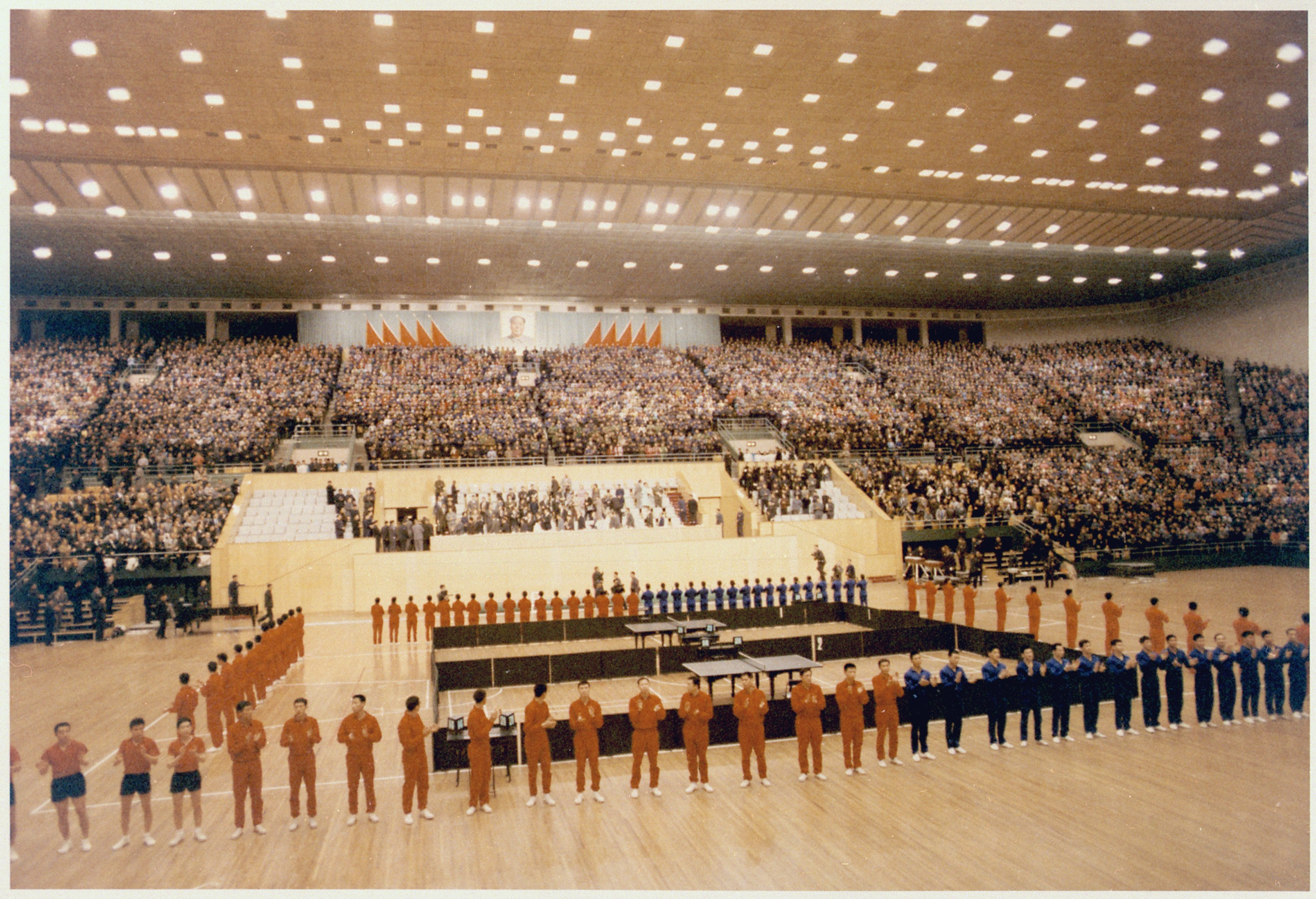
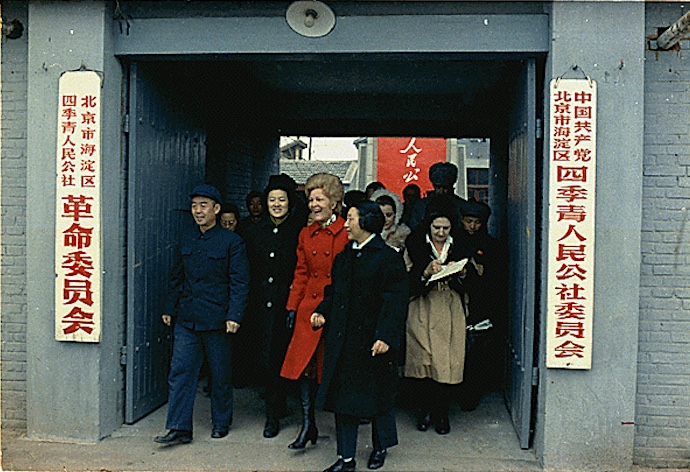
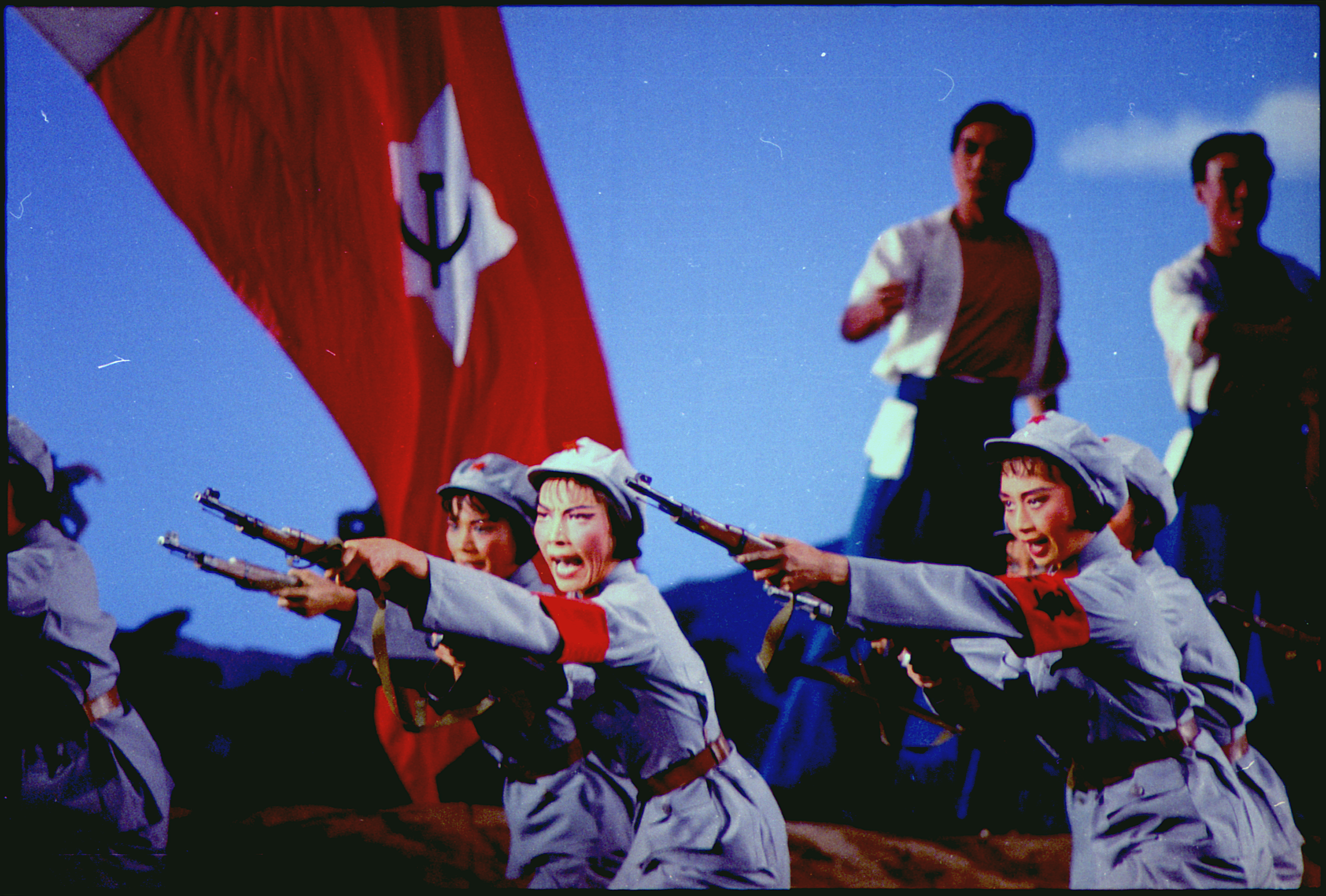
Richard Nixon's visit to Beijing in 1972, the first by a sitting U.S. president to China, marked the beginning of the People's Republic's orientation toward the Western bloc, the normalization of Sino-U.S. relations and the return of Western diplomatic and business interests to the city. Captions from left: (1) Air Force One at the Capital Airport; (2) Richard and Pat Nixon at the Badaling Great Wall, (3) the diplomatic opening was facilitated by "ping pong diplomacy", and leaders of the two countries watched a table tennis exhibition at the Capital Indoor Stadium; (4) Pat Nixon visits a neighborhood -- the Revolution Committee at the Sijiqing People's Commune -- in Haidian District; (5) the American delegation was treated to a performance of the revolutionary ballet, Red Detachment of Women at the Great Hall of the People.

In July 1971, U.S. President Richard Nixon announced that he would be going to China and made a historic trip in February 1972 during which he met with Mao in Beijing, visited the Great Wall, received a pair of giant pandas from the Beijing Zoo and began the process of normalizing Sino-U.S. relations. The Nixon trip and the accession of the People's Republic to the China seat at the United Nations in October 1971, marked the beginning of the country's diplomatic orientation toward the Western bloc. In 1971–72, 30 countries, mostly in Europe and Latin America, severed ties with the Republic of China on Taiwan and established diplomatic relations with the People's Republic of China. The embassy district in eastern Beijing, outside Dongzhimen, Chaoyangmen and Jianguomen began to expand with diplomatic compounds, hotels, and Western business interests, and eventually developed into the city's Central Business District.

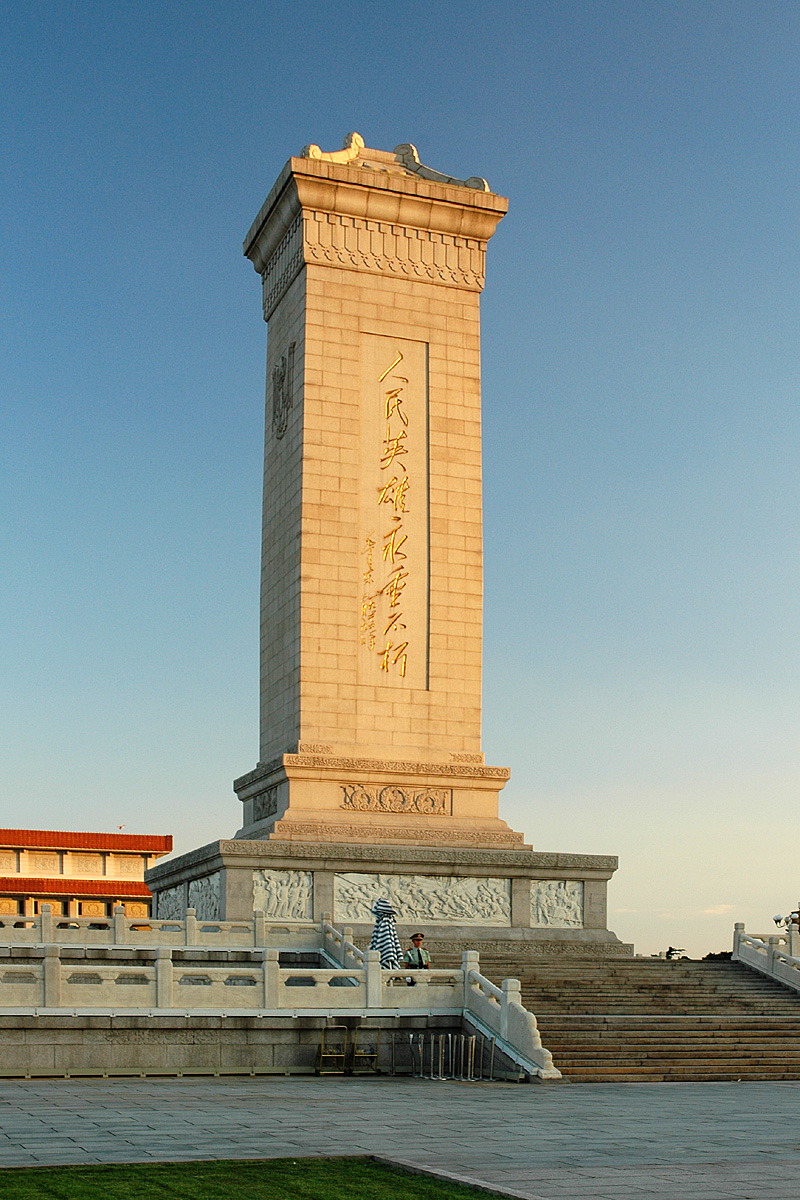
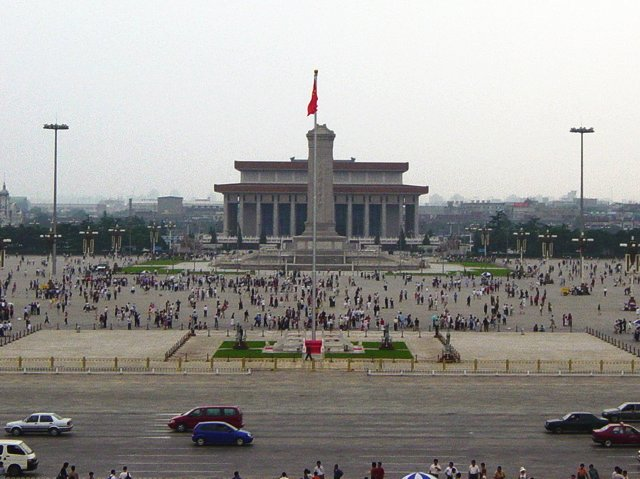
The Monument to the People's Heroes was erected in Tiananmen Square in 1958 to commemorate the martyrs of revolutions in modern Chinese history. Mourners of Zhou Enlai laid thousands of floral wreaths at and around the foot of the monument during the April 5th Movement of 1976. The Monument later became the gathering point student leaders during the 1989 Tiananmen Square Protests. Behind the Monument is the Mao Zedong Mausoleum, completed in 1977.

After Zhou Enlai died on January 8, 1976, Yao Wenyuan published a series of propaganda works criticizing the legacy of Zhou, which drew widespread public disapproval. On March 20, 1976, students from the Niufang Primary School laid a wreath at the Monument to the People's Heroes in Tiananmen Square to commemorate Zhou, and others followed. Many of the wreaths carried poems remembering the Premier also criticized the Gang of Four through allegorical allusions. By the time of Qingming Festival on April 4, a traditional tomb-sweeping holiday, the square was filled with wreaths and poetry and an estimated two million city residents visited to pay their respects. The following day, the Gang of Four ordered the police to seize and destroy the wreaths and seal off the square from further access. In clashes with residents, hundreds were arrested. The April Fifth Incident, the largest spontaneous public gathering against the Cultural Revolution, was branded a counter-revolutionary criminal incident blamed on Deng Xiaoping, who was purged.

Mao died in Beijing on September 9, 1976, and his mausoleum in Tiananmen Square was completed one year later. Less than one month after his death on October 7, 1976, the Gang of Four was arrested in Zhongnanhai by Mao's former security chief, Wang Dongxing, in a bloodless coup supported by Mao's anointed successor Hua Guofeng and military chief Ye Jianying. The arrests ended the Cultural Revolution. Deng Xiaoping was rehabilitated and then wrested power away from Hua. At the Third plenary session of the 11th Central Committee of the Chinese Communist Party held in December 1978, the Party, under Deng's leadership, rehabilitated the victims of Cultural Revolution, reversed the verdict of the April Fifth Incident, and adopted a policy course of economic reforms. College entrance exams were restored in 1977 and most of the rusticated youth returned to the city.

=== 1976–1989 ===
Residential architecture in Beijing

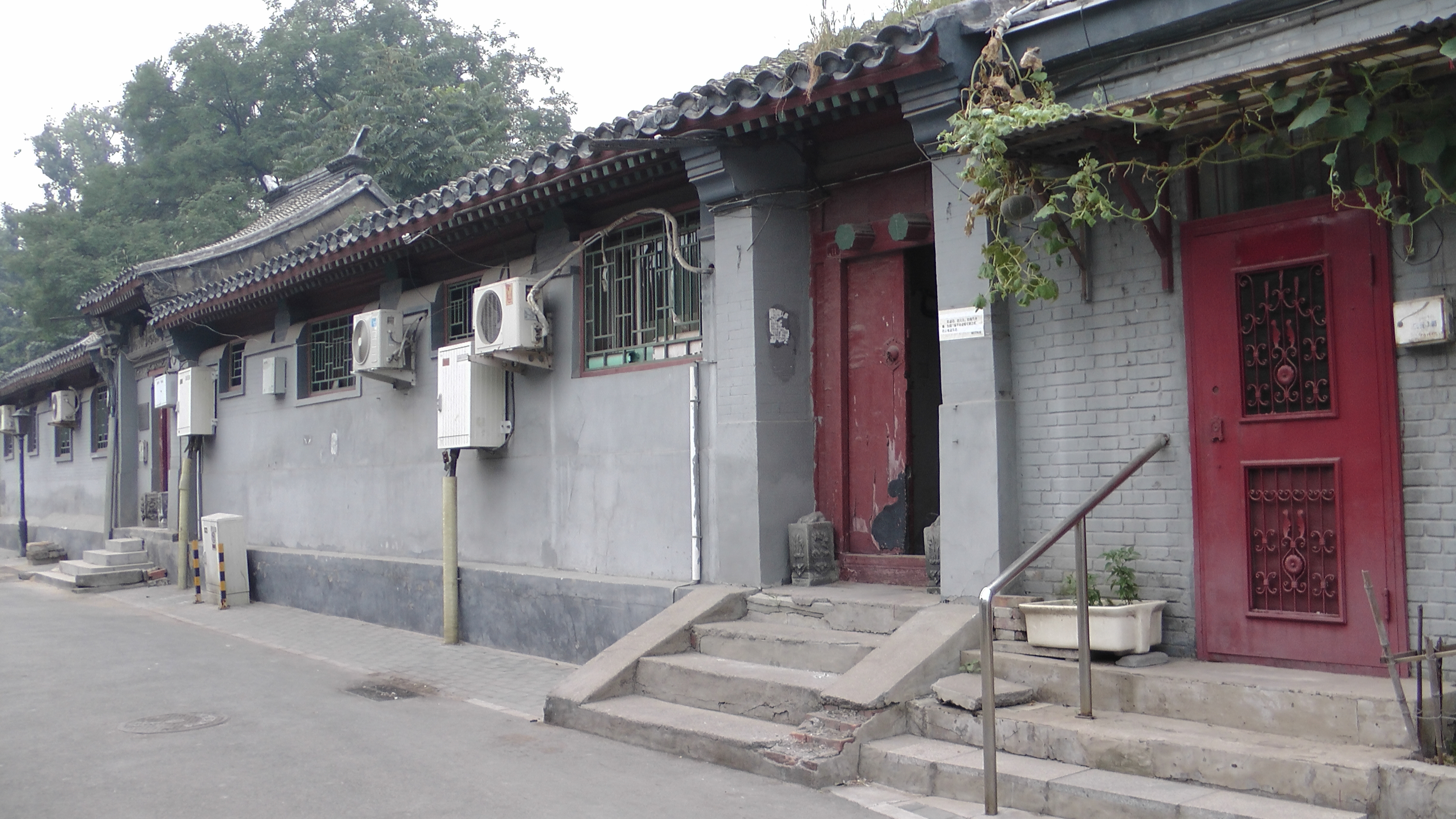
traditional courtyard residence

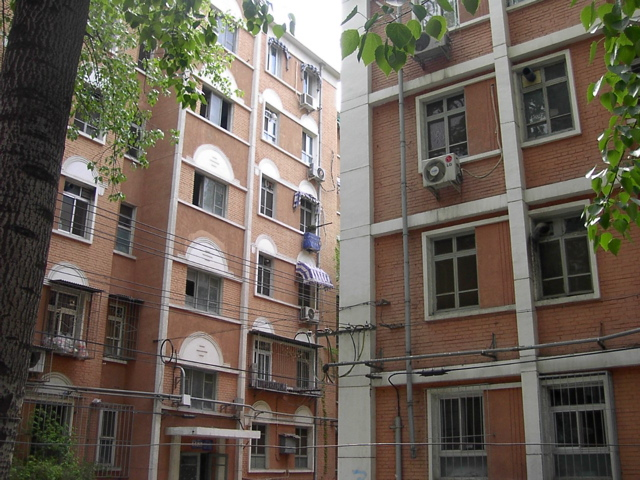
Socialist walk-up apartment blocks built in Hepingli in the 1960s

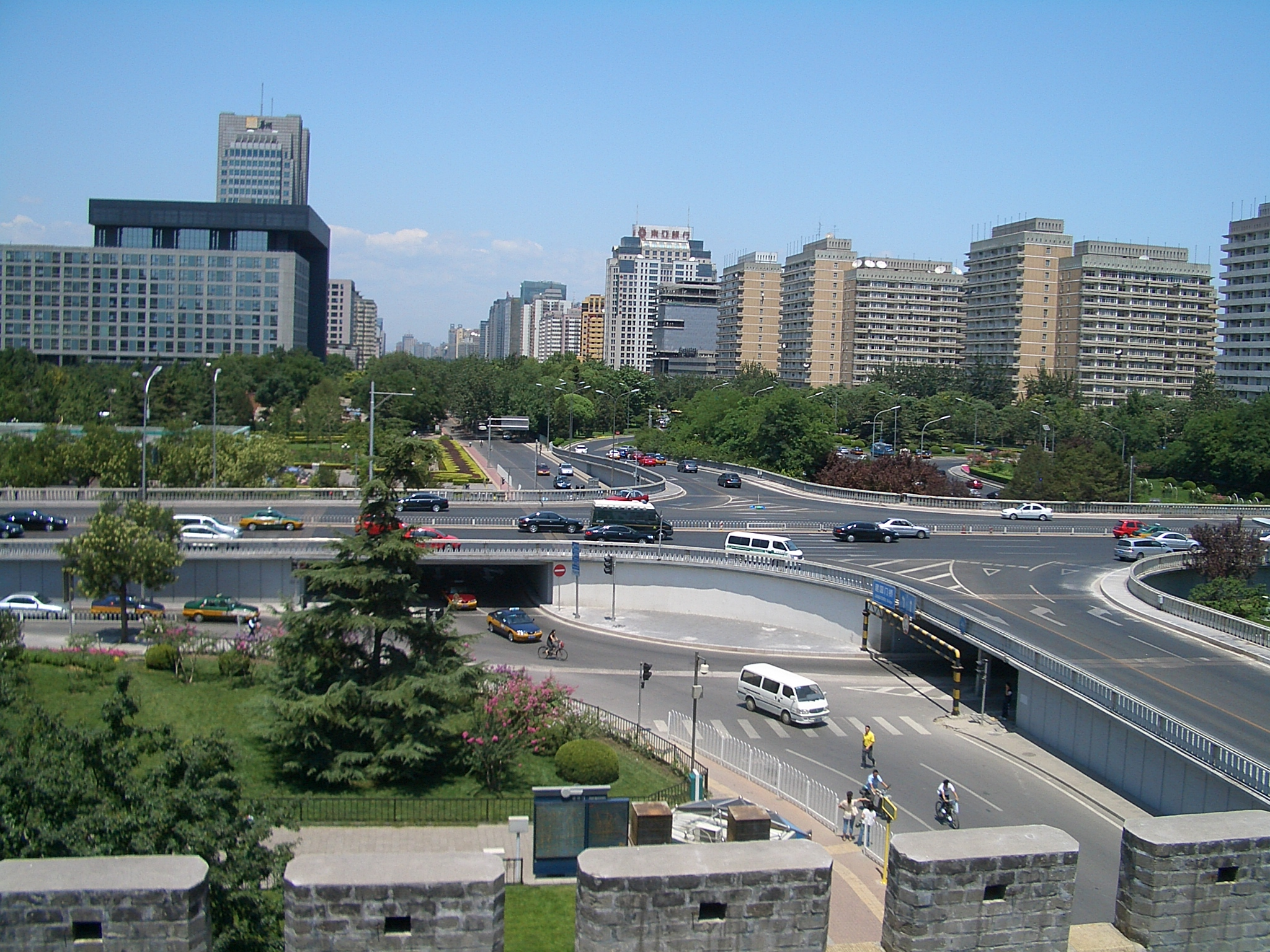
Jianguomen Diplomatic Residences built in 1971

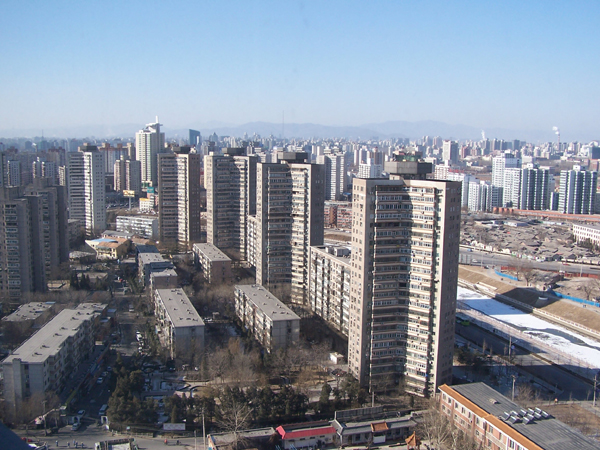
Apartment blocks built in Xibahe in the 1980s

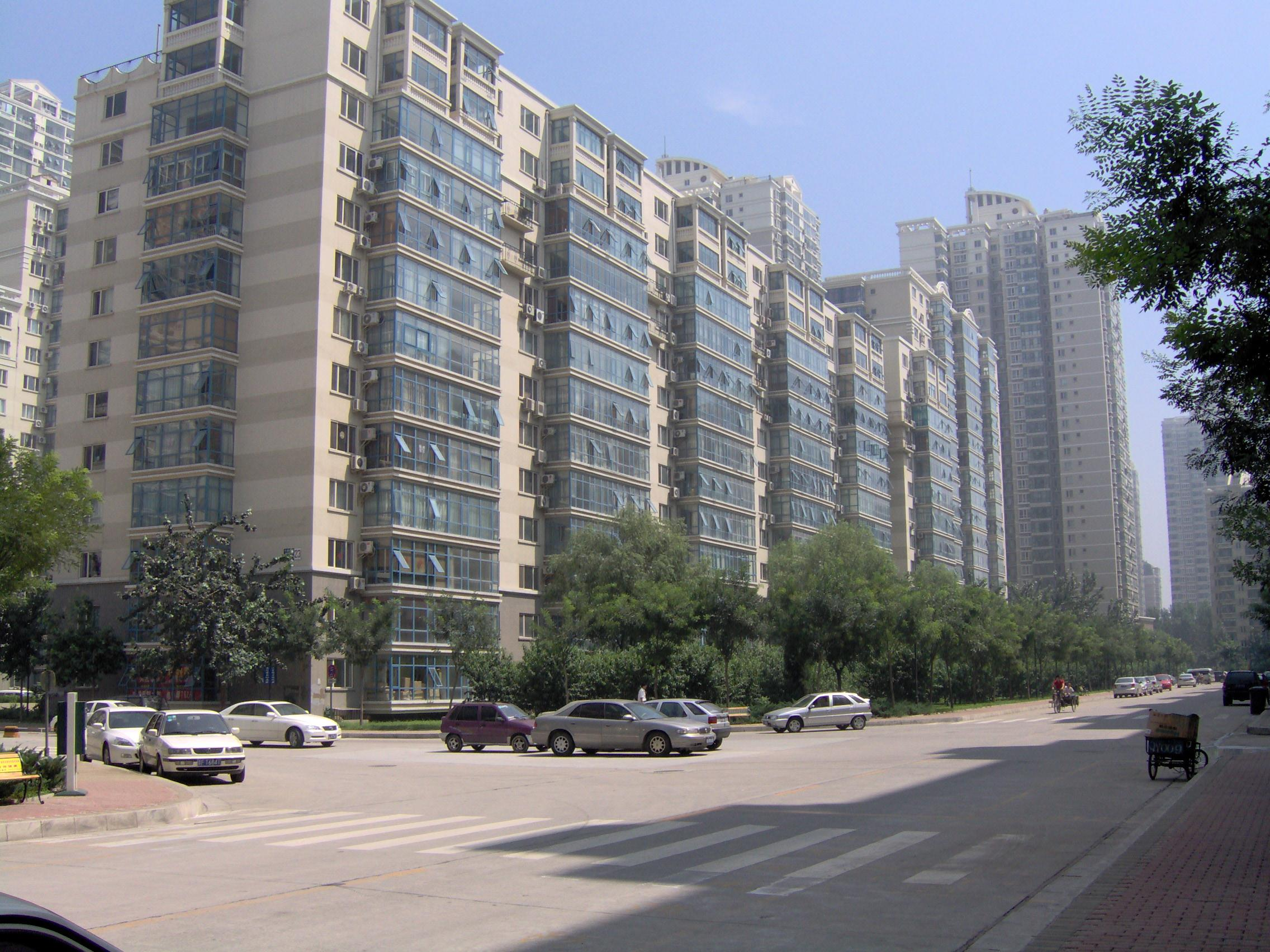
Apartment blocks built in Tiantongyuan in the 1990s and 2000s

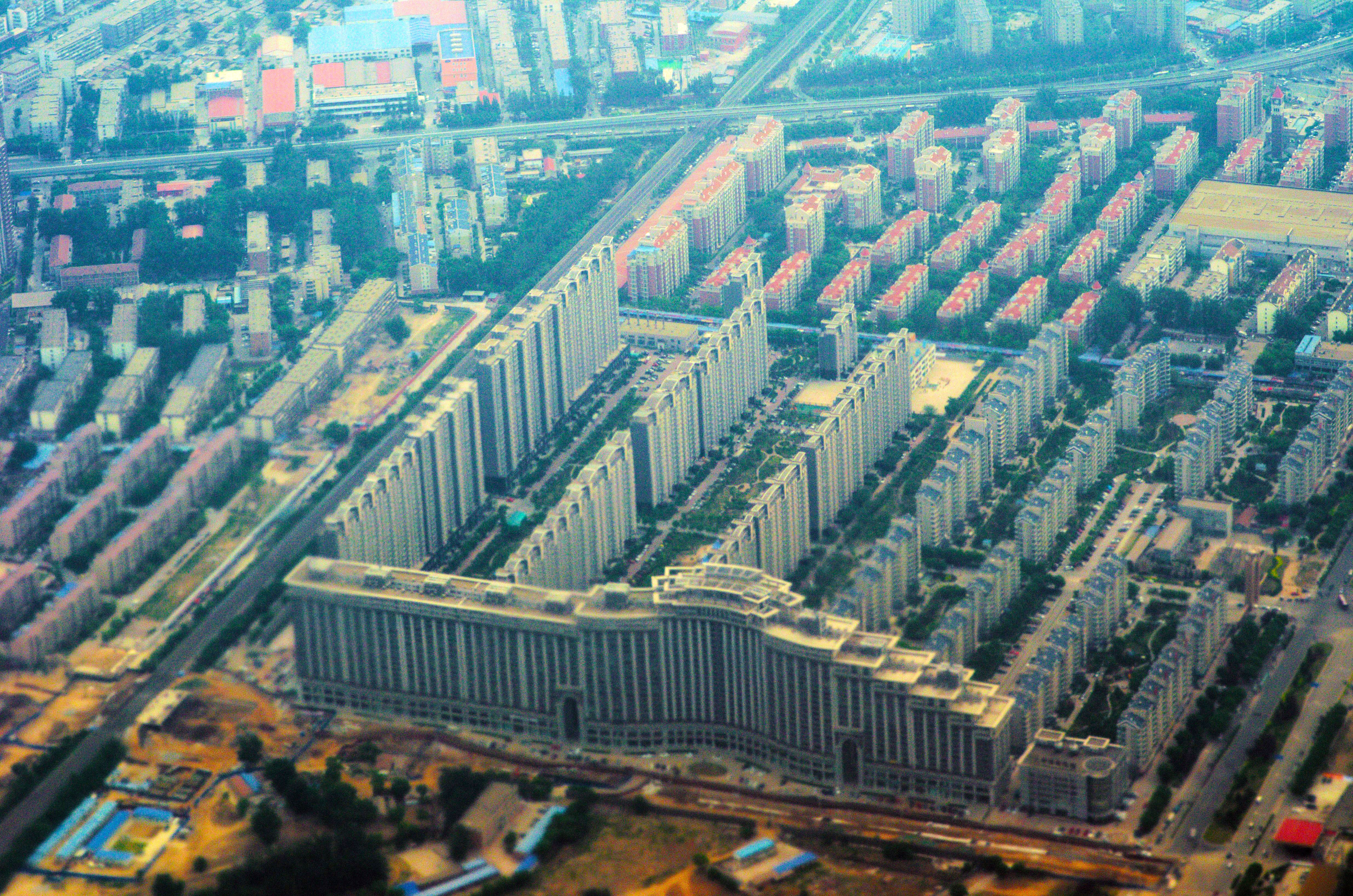
Apartment blocks in Beijing Municipal Administrative Center (Tongzhou district)

==== Beijing Spring ====
As the national leadership was changing course, a brief period of political openness in the city known as Beijing Spring gave rise to a grassroots pro-democracy movement. In September 1978, a magazine of the Party Youth League, under the leadership of party liberal Hu Yaobang, sought to publish poetry from the April 5th Incident. The publication was blocked by propaganda chief Wang Dongxing for failing to praise Mao. In November, the articles were instead posted on a wall near a bus stop on Chang'an Avenue at Xidan, west of Tiananmen Square. Subsequently, Huang Xiang and several poets from Guizhou, who had posted political poetry outside the People's Daily office on Wangfujing Avenue in October, also posted their works on the wall. Others soon followed suit and the Xidan Democracy Wall, as it became known, attracted thousands of posters and hundreds of thousands of readers. Victims of the Cultural Revolution sought justice—some called for the release of those jailed in the April Fifth Incident of 1976; some criticized Mao and Hua Guofeng's continuation of the Maoist line; and others complained of youth unable to return from the countryside. On November 26, Deng Xiaoping told a visiting Japanese politician that the writing of the big-character posters was protected by the Constitution. On December 5, Wei Jingsheng, an electrician at the Beijing Zoo, posted The Fifth Modernization a call for political reform. A public forum convened at the Monument to the People's Heroes where speakers debated the political future of the country.

On January 3, 1979, a People's Daily editorial, declared: "Let the people's say what they wish. The heavens will not fall." On January 14, a crowd of Cultural Revolution victims marched from Tiananmen Square to Zhongnanhai calling for food, work, democracy and human rights. A China Human Rights Association was formed and distributed 19-point declaration demanding the freedom of speech and right to evaluate state leaders. The gatherings and public challenge to authority alarmed party conservatives who pressed Deng to take a harder line and he did so after consolidating control of the party. In late March, the city government restricted public postings and gatherings to only Xidan. Wei Jingsheng was arrested, and convicted and sentenced in October to 15 years in imprisonment for leaking state secrets about China's war with Vietnam. In December 1979, postings at the Xidan Wall were banned and instead consigned to the Temple of the Moon. In 1980, the State Constitution (1978 version) was amended to eliminate the right to post big-character posters. Although Beijing Spring ended, the tensions within the party between liberals and conservatives over the toleration of dissent continued into the next decade.

==== Urban planning in the 1980s ====
As the city emerged from the Mao era, urban planning in Beijing moved in a new direction. In April 1980, in reviewing the city's application for infrastructure funding, Hu Yaobang, the newly designated CCP General Party Secretary set forth the guiding principles for Beijing's development. As the country's political center, Beijing should become a center for international exchange to support China's opening to the world. As a window to the world, the city should be the most orderly, clean and scenic city in the country. The city should also strive to become among the most advanced in the world for science and technology, culture and education. The city should raise the standard of living for its residents and develop an economy suitable for the unique qualities of the national capital. Beijing would no longer attract heavy industry. In 1981, city planners devised a blueprint that organized urban expansion around concentric ring roads. The aging inner core of the city, where the historical relics are concentrated, would have low density development and renewed over time. New enterprises would be built in the second band (between the 2nd and 3rd Ring Roads). With the imposition of the one-child policy, city planners expected to control the city's population to 10 million by 2000 with 40% living in the urban center and the remainder in residential communities scattered around the third band. Examples of these satellite communities include the Asian Games Village in the north and Fangzhuang in the south. Beijing Subway's first line, which commenced trial operations in 1969 but was plagued by technical problems, finally passed inspection assessments in 1981.

==== 1989 Tiananmen Square protests and massacre ====
The student-led demonstrations in the spring of 1989, which drew broad support from city residents, attracted worldwide attention and exposed deep divisions within the country's leadership, ended in bloodshed on June 3–4, as conservative leaders ordered a military crackdown of unprecedented force. The confrontation in Tiananmen Square was the culmination of a decade-long debate within the Communist Party and society over the freedom of expression and the course of political reform.

As liberal leaders Hu Yaobang and Zhao Ziyang guided the country through economic reforms, conservative leaders pushed back with a Campaign against "Spiritual Pollution" in 1983. Paramount leader Deng Xiaoping sided with the reformers and ended that campaign. By 1986, newspaper editorials began calling for political reform and university students organized democracy salons. Liberal physicist Fang Lizhi toured campuses, advocating democratic reforms and the independence of universities from the government. In December 1986, student protests in Hefei spread to Beijing, where students marched around campuses in the university district northwest of the city, calling for direct election of political representatives, freedom of the press and release of political prisoners. On January 1 and 2, 1987, several hundred students attempted to march on Tiananmen Square in defiance of orders of the city government. The protests attracted little public attention but party conservatives reacted with fury at Hu Yaobang for his "weak" response to "bourgeois liberalism". Hu Yaobang was forced to resign on January 17 and Fang Lizhi was expelled from the Communist Party. Zhao Ziyang succeeded Hu as Party General Secretary and Li Peng became Premier.

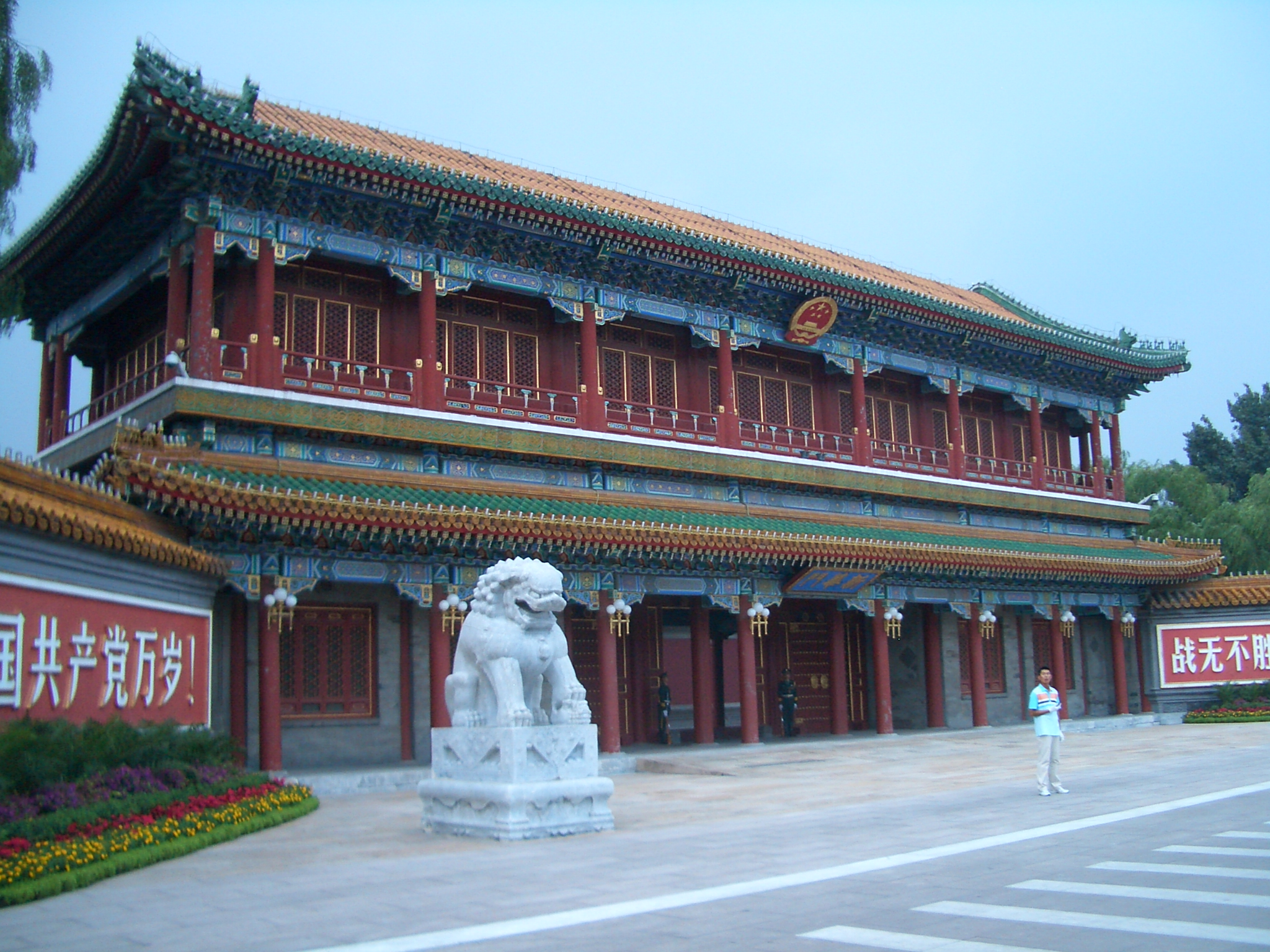
The New China Gate to Zhongnanhai on Chang'an Avenue between Tiananmen Square and Xidan. Shortly after Hu Yaobang's death in April 1989, university students staged a silent sit-in outside the gate, demanding dialogue with the leadership. The sit-in was dispersed by police and provoked the first large-scale student march on April 21.

When Hu Yaobang died suddenly on April 15, 1989, university students laid wreaths at the Monument to the People's Heroes and organized sit-ins outside the Great Hall of the People and Zhongnanhai. They demanded the Party rescind past criticism of Hu, renounce the campaigns against spiritual pollution and bourgeois liberalism, disclose the assets of the family members of party officials, lift orders against public assembly, permit freedom of the press, and increase salaries for university graduates. On the night of April 21, 100,000 students marched into Tiananmen Square to attend Hu's funeral, which was held inside the Great Hall of the People the following day. Officials inside the Hall did not meet with students in the Square, who began to boycott classes. Workers formed an independent union and joined the protests. On April 23, as Zhao Ziyang was departing for a trip to North Korea, he told Li Peng to restore normalcy, avoid worsening tensions with students and refrain from using force, except against those who commit offenses against life and property.

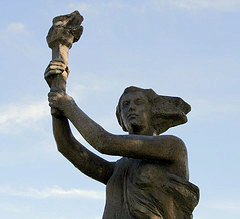
A bronze replica of the Goddess of Democracy statue in Washington, D.C. The original plaster of paris statue, created by students and teachers of the Central Academy of Arts, stood in Tiananmen Square for six days from May 30 to June 4, 1989, and was torn down by the military enforcing martial law.

On April 24, at a meeting of the politburo chaired by Li Peng, Beijing Party Secretary Li Ximing and Mayor Chen Xitong said the student demonstrations were manipulated by plotters seeking to overthrow the party-state and had to be halted. The following day, Deng Xiaoping, after hearing reports from Premier Li Peng and President Yang Shangkun, called the demonstrations a "disturbance" that was to be halted through coercive measures. Deng's characterization was published in the People's Daily editorial of April 26. The students felt maligned by the editorial and 100,000 from more than 40 universities marched to the city center, past Tiananmen Square to the Lama Temple, breaking through police blockades along the way.

When Zhao Ziyang returned from North Korea, he delivered a conciliatory speech commemorating the 70th Anniversary of the May Fourth Movement, which was favorably received by the students. On May 4, he also told the board of the Asian Development Bank that there would not be turmoil in China, that the students, who accepted the country's reforms, were not fundamentally opposed to party leadership and socialism, but simply wanted leaders to correct errors in their work. Students from 47 institutions, including thousands streaming in from other parts of the country, marched on May 4 without police interference. On May 8, Zhao Ziyang chaired a politburo standing committee meeting and proposed six points of reform including the disclosure of officials' assets, expanded press freedoms and rule of law. Wan Li, chairman of the National People's Congress, called a parliamentary session for June 20 to consider the reform agenda. Li Peng, however, opposed the agenda, and only a portion of which was published in the People's Daily on May 9.

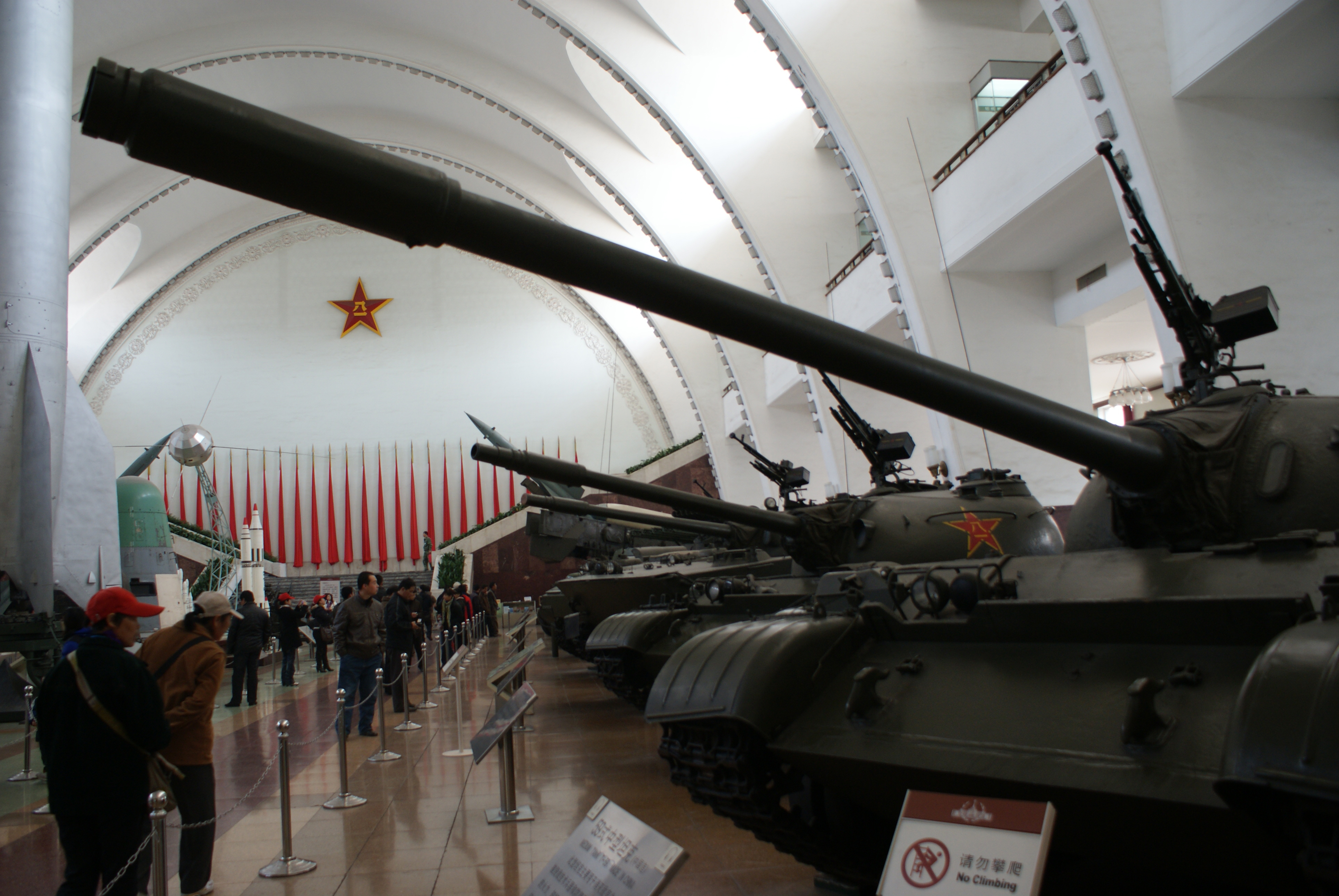
The Hall of Tanks inside the Military Museum of the Chinese People's Revolution, on Chang'an Avenue in western Beijing. At nearby Muxidi on the night of June 3, soldiers of the 38th Army opened fire on civilian demonstrators. The following morning, the 28th Army was surrounded at Muxidi by angry residents showing bloody clothing from the massacre the night before. The 28th Army's commanders defied orders to counterattack and instead had troops retreat into the museum, leaving their vehicles to be burned by protesters outside.

On May 13, to support political reforms and demonstrate their peaceful resolve, about 300 students began a hunger strike in Tiananmen Square, which soon expanded to thousands. A makeshift tent city was set up for the hunger strikers, who attracted broad public sympathy. On May 15–17, more than million people visited the Square each day. Many government employees marched in support. Relaxed censorship allowed news of the hunger strike to be broadcast nationally. Foreign press on hand to cover the visit of Mikhail Gorbachev brought worldwide attention to the demonstrations. On May 18, Li Peng met with several student representatives but the two sides failed to agree on how to end the hunger strike. To defuse tensions, Zhao Ziyang tried to persuade Deng Xiaoping to back off of the April 26 editorial, but Li Peng said Zhao's approach was not working and the party center could not afford to speak with two voices. Student protests had spread to 27 cities. On the night of May 17, Deng Xiaoping resolved to impose martial law, which was signed by Li Peng and announced by Chen Xitong on May 19. That night, Zhao Ziyang made his final appearance in public, warning the hunger striking students in the Square that he had come too late. The students called off the hunger strike.

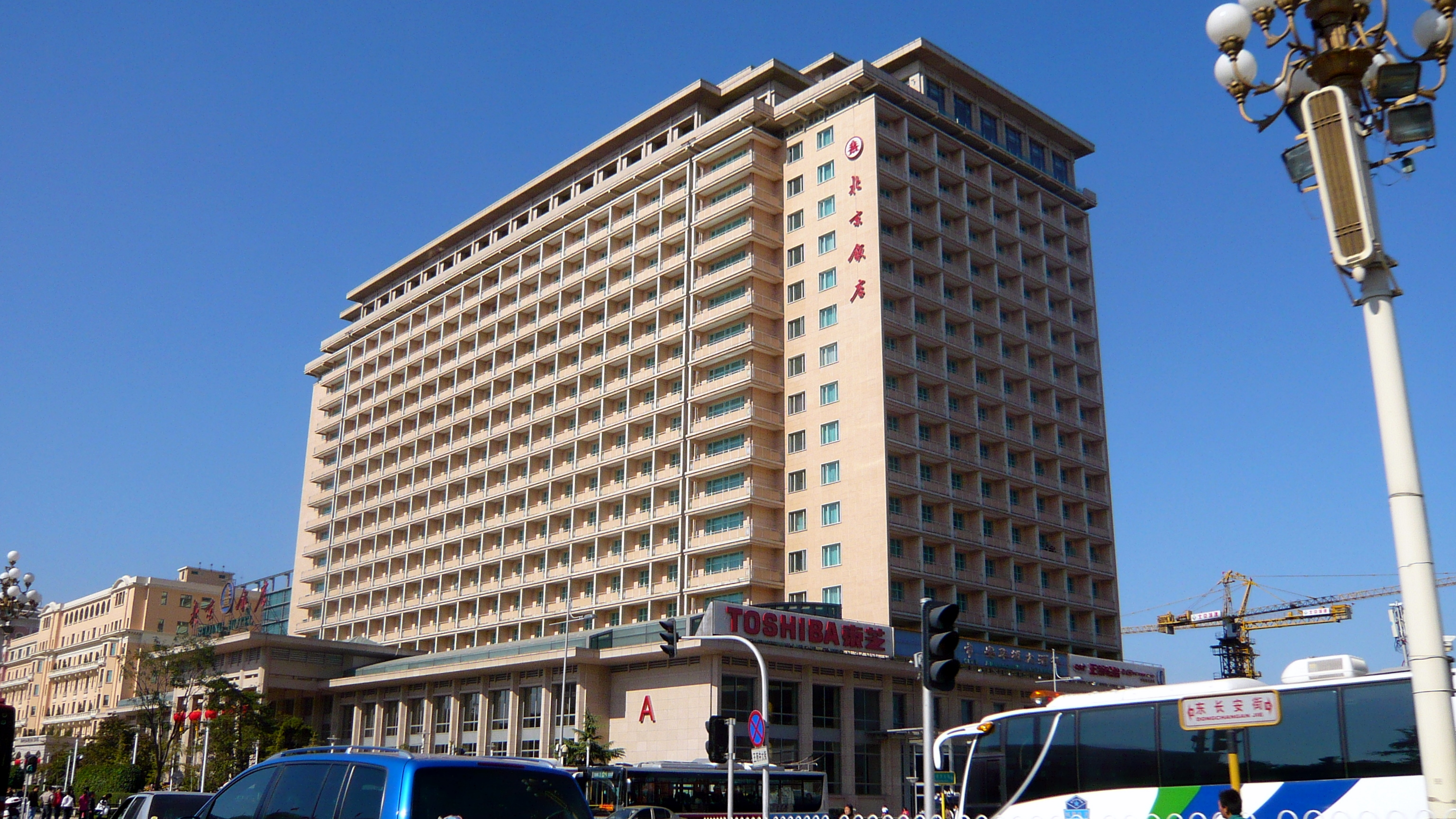
The East Building of the Beijing Hotel, built in 1974, was the tallest building in city until 1984. On June 5, 1989, from the hotel's porches overlooking Chang'an Avenue, foreign press took the iconic image of the lone protester standing in front a column tanks.

On May 20, at least 180,000 People's Liberation Army and People's Armed Police personnel advanced on the city to enforce martial law, but students and Beijing residents managed to block them outside the Third Ring Road by surrounding their vehicles. Residents brought food and water to the soldiers and pleaded with them not to advance on the peaceful demonstrations. More than a million people marched in defiance of the martial law order, many calling for the resignation of Deng Xiaoping and Li Peng. The troops pulled back on May 23. The commander of the 38th Army, who refused to enforce the martial law order, was court-martialed. On May 27, student leaders voted to end their occupation of the Square on May 30, but some students remained, believing that the protests would lose leverage and held out hope that National People's Congress would convene in June. On May 25, Wan Li, who had been on a foreign trip, was summoned by Zhao to call an emergency parliamentary meeting to invalidate the martial law order. But Wan's plane was diverted to Shanghai, and he subsequently declared support for martial law. On May 30, students and teachers from the Central Academy of Arts erected a 10-meter high Goddess of Democracy statue in the Square, which boosted student morale and drew millions of visitors.

On the afternoon of June 3, demonstrators confronted soldiers in plain clothes sneaking weapons into the city and police fired tear gas at the demonstrators. That evening, state-run television warned residents to stay indoors but crowds of people took to the streets to block the incoming army. Armored military units advanced on Beijing from every cardinal direction. At about 10:00 pm troops opened fire on protesters with live ammunition at Wukesong intersection west of the Square, where the first civilian fatality occurred. Crowds were stunned and responded by hurling insults and projectiles. Among those killed was Duan Changlong, a Tsinghua University student, who was shot in the chest as he tried to negotiate with soldiers at Xidan. Duan was the grand nephew of the warlord Duan Qirui, whose troops were responsible for the March 18 Massacre in 1926, deadliest use of force against students in the history of Beijing until 1989. As news of the lethal force reached the Square, students at the Square were persuaded to leave the Square by several older intellectuals, including future Nobel Peace Prize winner, Liu Xiaobo. At about 4:00 am, troops from the west and south fought their way to the Square, and at 5:00 am most of the students retreated out of the Square to the south. Several students were hit by lethal gunfire in the Square and nearly a dozen were run over by an armored personnel vehicle west of the Square. Tanks also ran over the tent city. Helicopters lifted away the debris. By dawn of June 4, the army controlled the Square and major intersections around the city although clashes with residents continued. Tiananmen Mothers, a victims' organization, has recorded civilian deaths all along Chang'an Avenue, from Wukesong in the west to Tiananmen in the center to Jianguomen in the east, and throughout the city, from Hongmiao in the east, Hepingli in the north, and Tianqiao and Zhushikou in the south. Hundreds of civilians were killed, thousands were wounded and thousands more were detained.

On June 5, foreign press in the Beijing Hotel photographed a lone protester blocking a long column of tanks driving east of the Square on Chang'an Avenue. The identity of this protester, like many facts about the events of spring 1989, remains unknown because the government has barred any reporting, research or remembrance of the "June 4 Incident", which was officially deemed a counterrevolutionary rebellion. Zhao Ziyang was placed under house arrest for the remainder of his life. Jiang Zemin assumed the position of General Secretary of the Chinese Communist Party. Martial law was lifted on January 11, 1990. In subsequent years, first-year students at colleges in Beijing were required to undergo a year of military training.

=== 1990s ===
In 1990, Beijing's long-term residential population reached 10.32 million, of which 61% were in urban areas. In addition, the city had 1.27 million non-resident migrants, for a total population of 11.59 million.

From September 22 to October 7, 1990, Beijing hosted the 11th Asian Games, which were held in China for the first time and attended by 6,122 athletes from 37 countries competing in 29 sports. The city was awarded the games in 1984 over Osaka. The Asian Games Village was built north of the city center beyond the Third Ring Road. The Worker Stadium served as the Games' main venue. The city's bid for the 2000 Summer Olympic Games ended in September 1993 with a narrow loss by a vote of 43–45 in the final round to Sydney.

The 2nd Ring Road, under construction since the 1960s and built on the foundation of the outer Ming city wall, was finally completed in 1992. Where city gates once stood are now overpass exits. The 3rd Ring Road followed in 1993. Construction of the city's three other ring roads began in the 1990s and were completed in 2001 (4th Ring), 2003 (5th Ring) and 2009 (6th Ring).

The 1990s and the start of the new millennium were a period of rapid economic growth in Beijing. Following the reform and opening up of Deng Xiaoping, what was once farmland surrounding the city was developed into new residential and commercial districts. Modern expressways and high-rise buildings were built throughout the city to accommodate the growing and increasingly affluent population of the city. Foreign investment transformed Beijing into one of the most cosmopolitan and prosperous cities in the world. In September 1995, the city hosted the United Nations' Fourth World Conference on Women and a parallel gathering of non-government organizations in Huairou District.

Demonstrations in Spring 1999

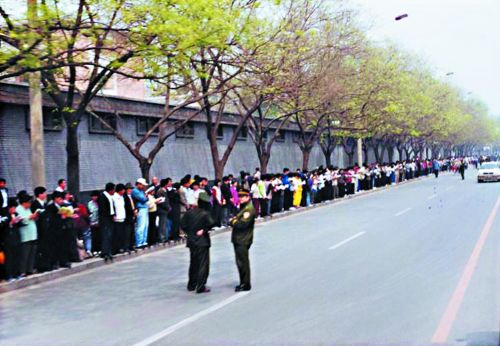
On April 25, 1999, Falun Gong practitioners assembled outside the Zhongnanhai compound on to protest criticism of the sect in the state media.

Also in 1995, Beijing's city government was shaken by a leadership scandal as Chen Xitong, party secretary and a member of the politburo, was removed from office and deputy-mayor Wang Baosen committed suicide. Chen was convicted and sentenced to 16 years imprisonment in 1998 of corruption and negligence of official duty and became the highest ranking Chinese official to be convicted of a crime since the trial of the Gang of Four. Chen reportedly lost a power struggle against Party General Secretary Jiang Zemin and the "Shanghai Clique". He maintained that the charges against him were politically motivated.

In March 1997, two bombs detonated on Beijing buses. The first bomb hit a Route 22 Bus in Xidan on the night of March 7, killing three and injuring ten. The second, one day later, claimed two more lives. The bombings, which followed the outbreak of protests and bombings in Xinjiang, took place during the annual sessions of the legislature and political consultative conference in the capital, and were widely blamed on Uyghur separatists. In 1999, the Xinjiang Village at Ganjiakou, was demolished a mere seven years after the Haidian government had recognized it. Though Uyghur shopowners were compensated for their losses, their community in the capital scattered.

In the spring of 1999, two large public demonstrations took place in Beijing. On April 25, over 10,000 Falun Gong practitioners assembled outside Zhongnanhai to protest criticism of the sect in the state media. The gathering resulted in the government's prohibition of Falun Gong in China.

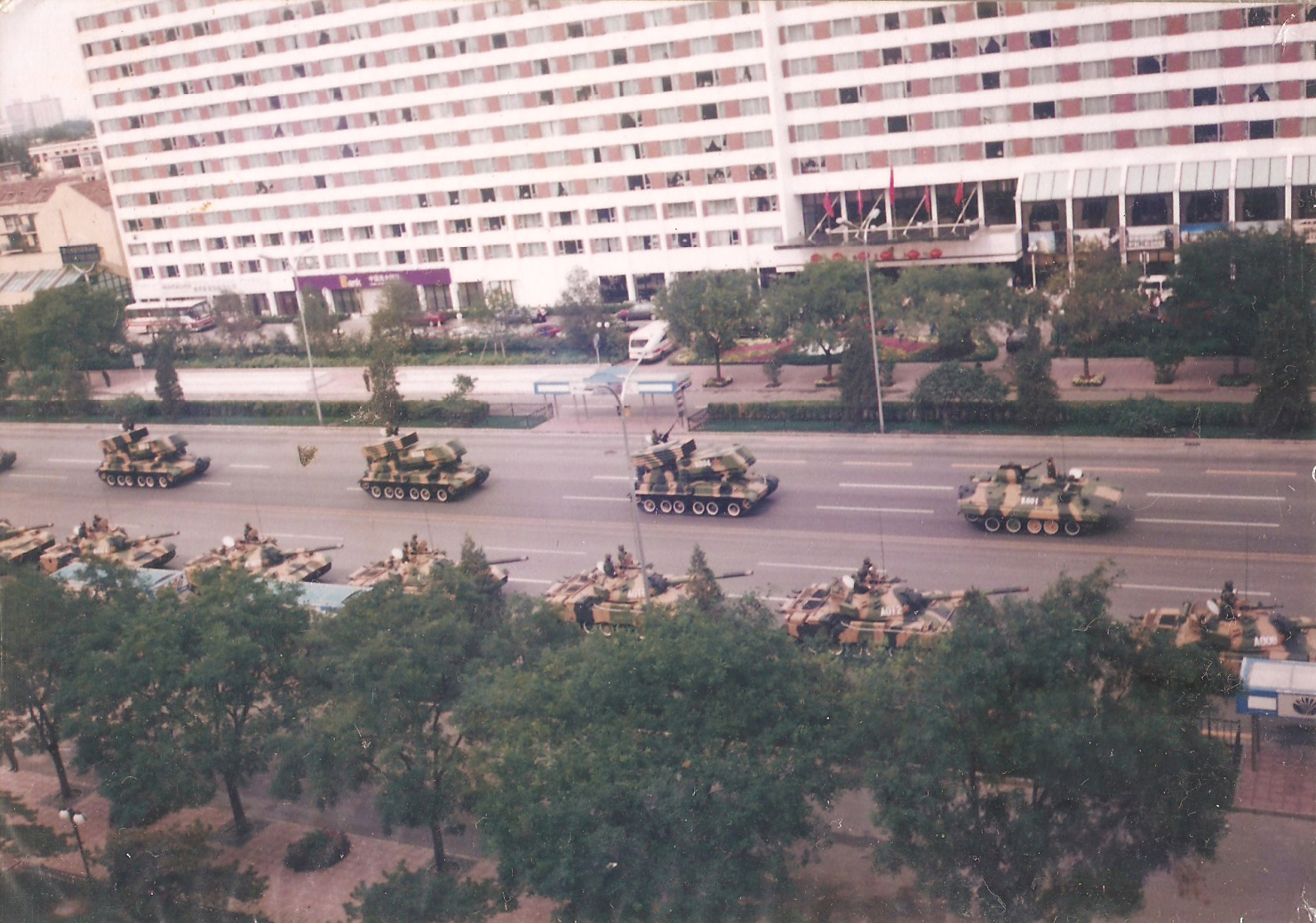
Armored column in the parade celebrating the 50th anniversary of the founding of the PRC on Oct. 1, 1999.

On May 8, following NATO's bombing of the Chinese Embassy in Belgrade, Yugoslavia, which killed three Chinese nationals, thousands of students and residents marched on the U.S. Embassy in Beijing to protest U.S. military aggression. Some of the protesters pelted the embassy compound with stones and smashed cars, keeping the U.S. ambassador and staff confined in the compound for several days. Then vice-president Hu Jintao declared the government's support for the demonstrations, which reflected the anger and patriotism of the Chinese people, but urged against extreme and illegal conduct. The crisis was diffused after U.S. President Bill Clinton issued an apology for the airstrike, which the Pentagon blamed on outdated maps, and agreed to pay $32.5 million to the victims of the bombing and to compensate for the damage to the Chinese Embassy in Belgrade. The Chinese government agreed to pay $2.87 million to compensate the U.S. for damage to its embassy and consulates in China.

On October 1, 1999, the city celebrated the 50th Anniversary of the founding of the People's Republic with a parade, the first since 1984.

=== 2000s ===
In 2000, the city's total population reached 13.56 million, including 2.49 million temporary migrants. The city's population has continued to grow, largely through inbound migration, reaching 15.38 million in 2005 (including 3.57 million temporary migrants) and exceeding 20 million in 2011. Of the 20.18 million total population in 2011, 12.77 million were long-term residents with temporary migrants making up 7.4 million (36.7%).

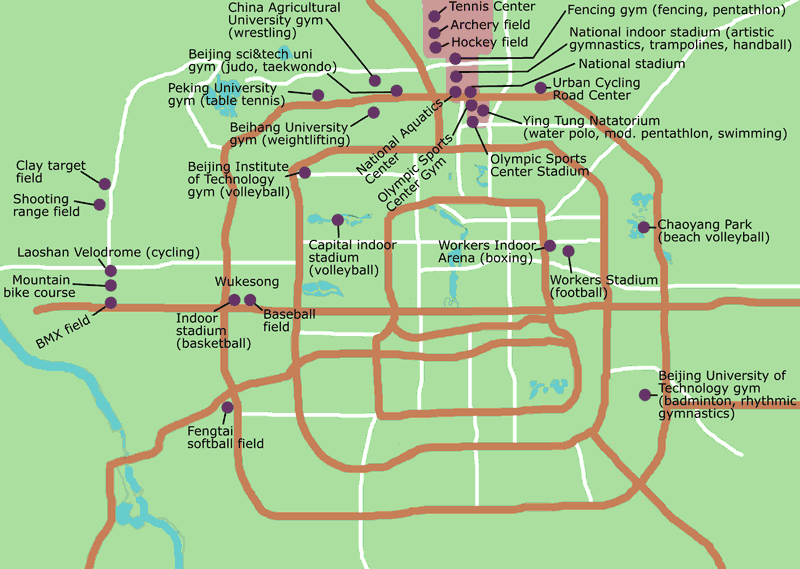
From 2001 to 2008, a clock on the east side of Tiananmen Square, counted down to the opening of the XXIX Olympiad. The Dancing Beijing features Beijing's "jing (京)" character styled to resemble a man running. Nearly all Olympic venues are located in the northern half of the city.

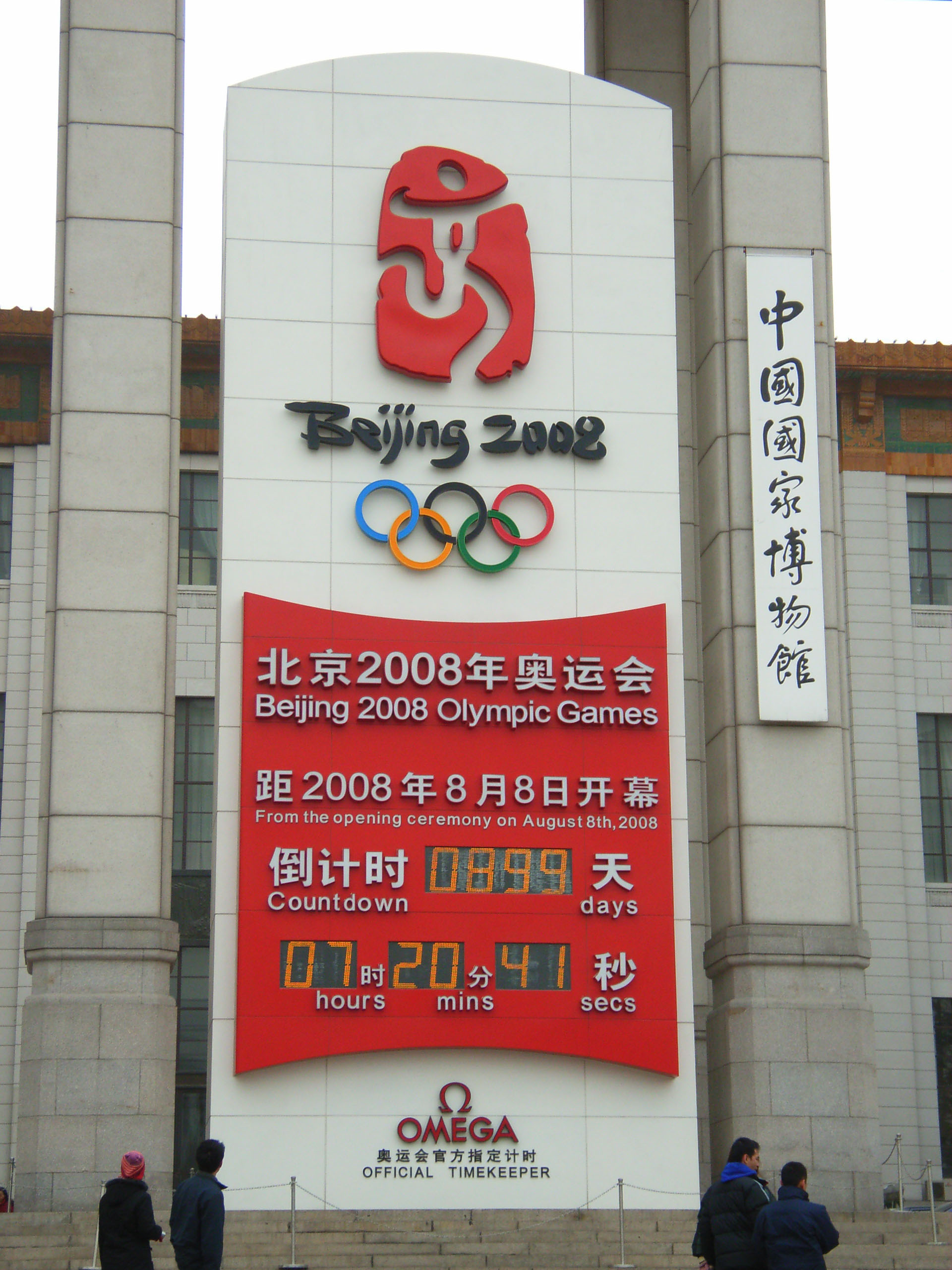

On July 13, 2001, at the 112th meeting of the International Olympic Committee in Moscow, Beijing was awarded the right to host the 2008 Summer Olympic and Paralympics Games. Under the motto "New Beijing, Great Olympics", the city pledged that holding the Games in China for the first time would promote not only the city's economy but also education, health and human rights of its residents. Beijing prevailed over Paris, Toronto, Istanbul and Osaka with an absolute majority of votes in the second round of balloting.

Over the next seven years, the city spent nearly ¥300 billion (about US$36 billion in 2005 exchange rate) in preparation. The city built 12 permanent athletic venues and 8 temporary venues, expanded 11 existing venues, and renovated 45 practice facilities. The bulk of the new venues was concentrated in the Olympic Green directly north of Tiananmen and the Forbidden City. Venues accounted for less than 5% of overall Olympic spending, the lion's share of which went to building infrastructure, including 578 km (359 mi) of express highways, six subway lines, Terminal 3 of the Capital Airport and the Beijing South railway station, and a high-speed high-speed railway to Tianjin. To improve environmental quality, the city added nine sewage treatment plants, dredged 290 km (180 mi) of waterways and built waste incineration and wind power generation facilities. From 2001 to 2007, the city's economy doubled in size and per capita income rose from $3,262 to $7,654.

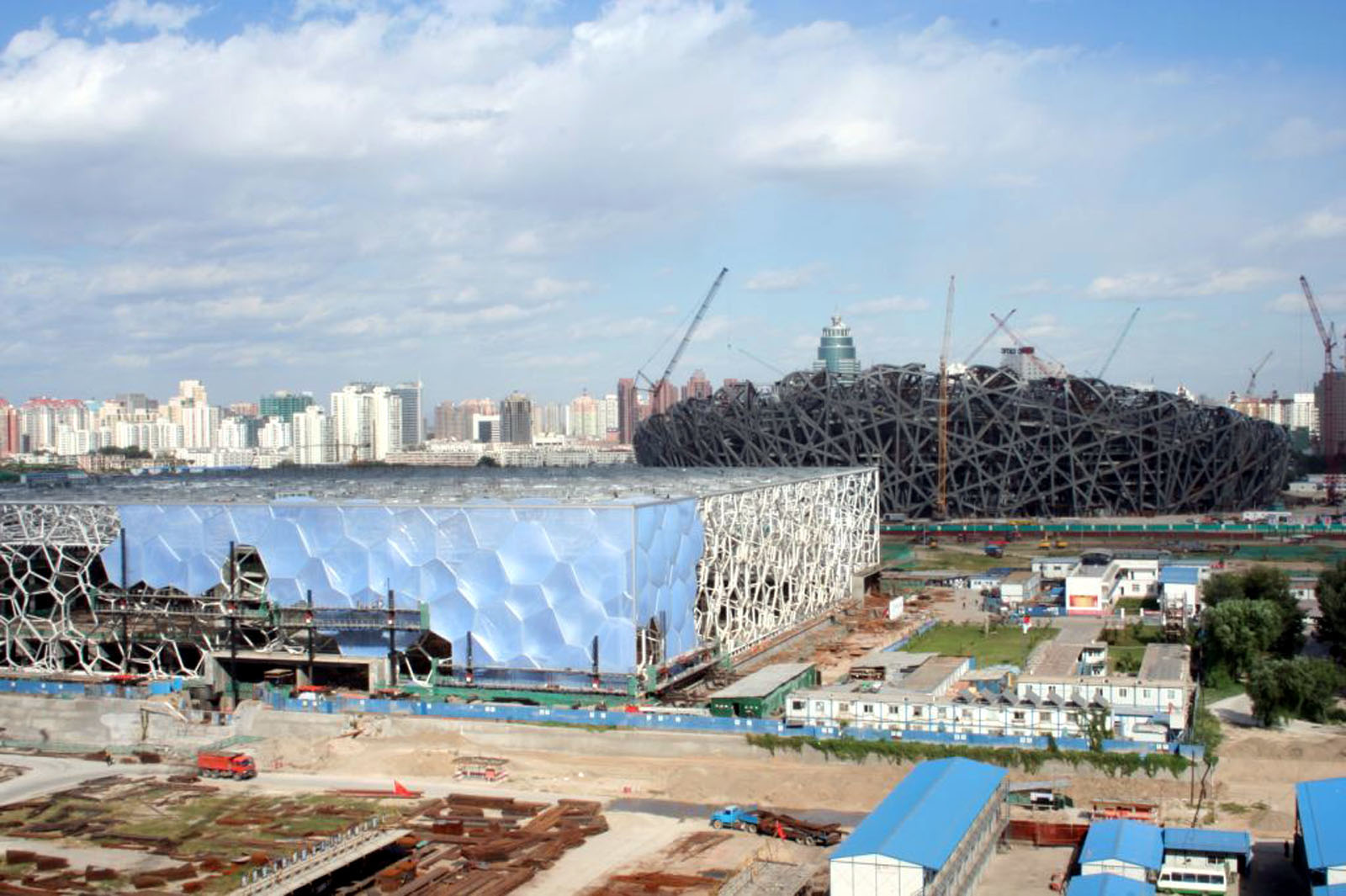
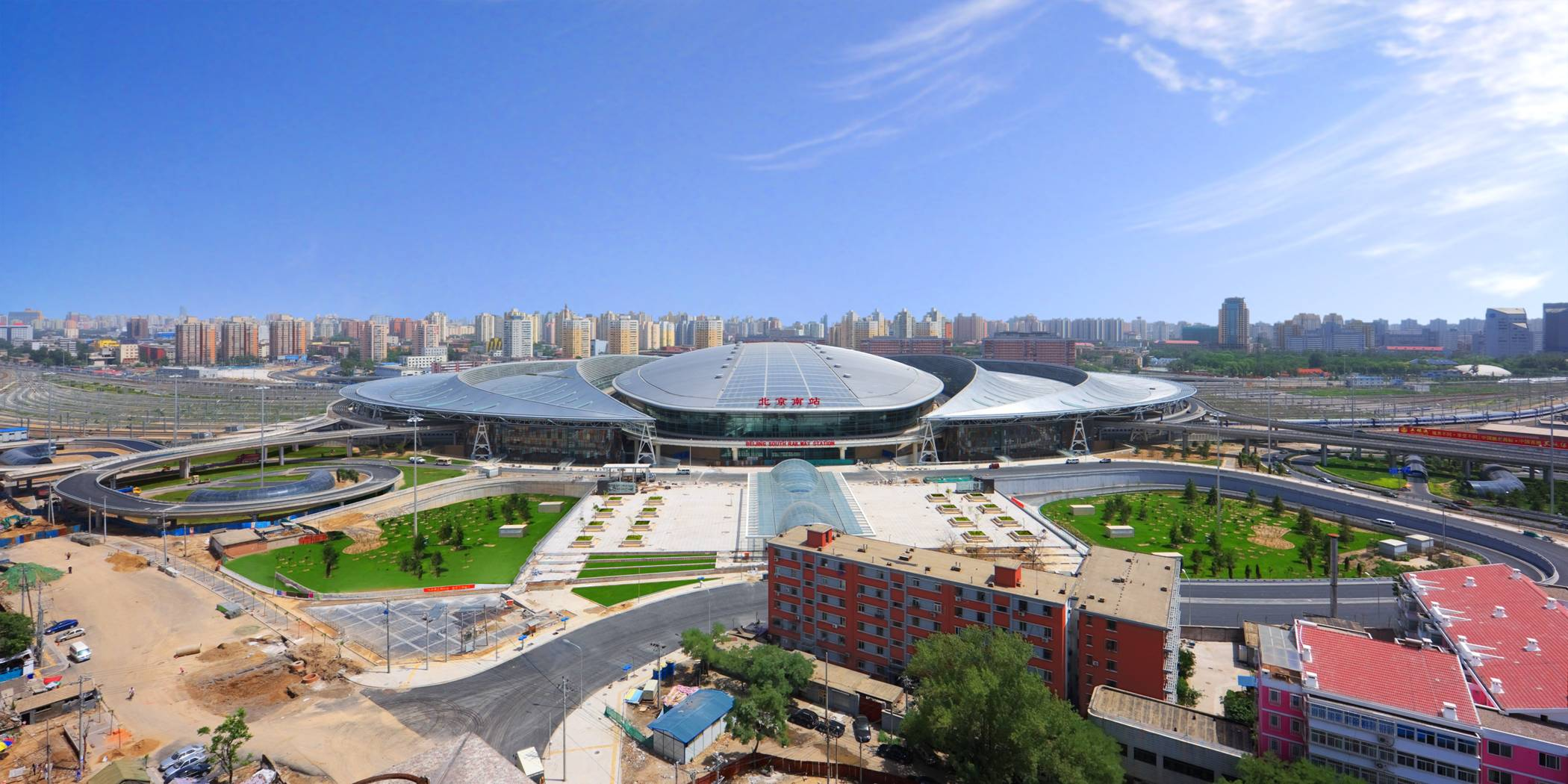
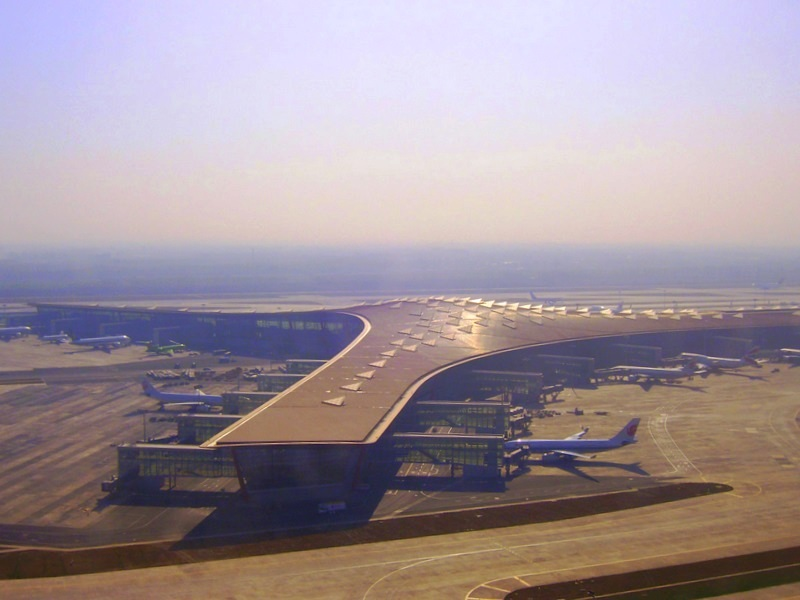
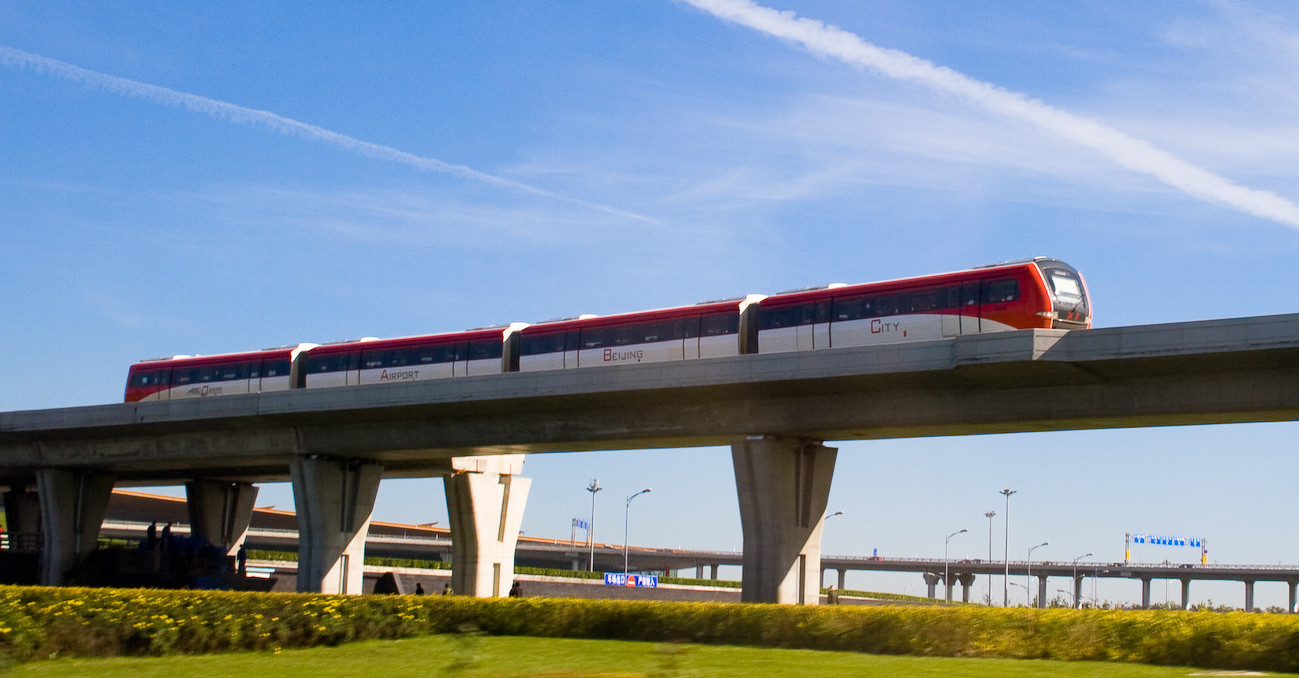
From left: (1) The Olympic Green in 2006 with the National Stadium ("Bird's Nest") and Aquatics Center ("Water Cube") under construction, (2) Beijing South railway station, a high-speed rail hub, opened on Aug. 1, 2008, (3) Terminal 3 of Capital Airport, was the world's largest when it opened on February 29, 2008, (4) The airport line of the Beijing Subway opened on July 19, 2008.

In March 2003, the Severe Acute Respiratory Syndrome (SARS) spread to Beijing from southern China. Initial underreporting of the epidemic by government authorities was exposed by Dr. Jiang Yanyong in early April and forced Health Minister Zhang Wenkang and mayor Meng Xuenong to resign in April. The city became the hardest hit in the SARS epidemic with 2,521 probable cases (including at least 394 infected medical personnel) and 191 deaths. Public schools, theaters, discos, and entertainment centers were closed at the order of the government in late April when 100 new cases were reported daily. A large quarantine base was set up in Changping District north of the city. After the last new case was reported on May 29, the epidemic subsided and the World Health Organization lifted the travel advisory for Beijing on June 24.

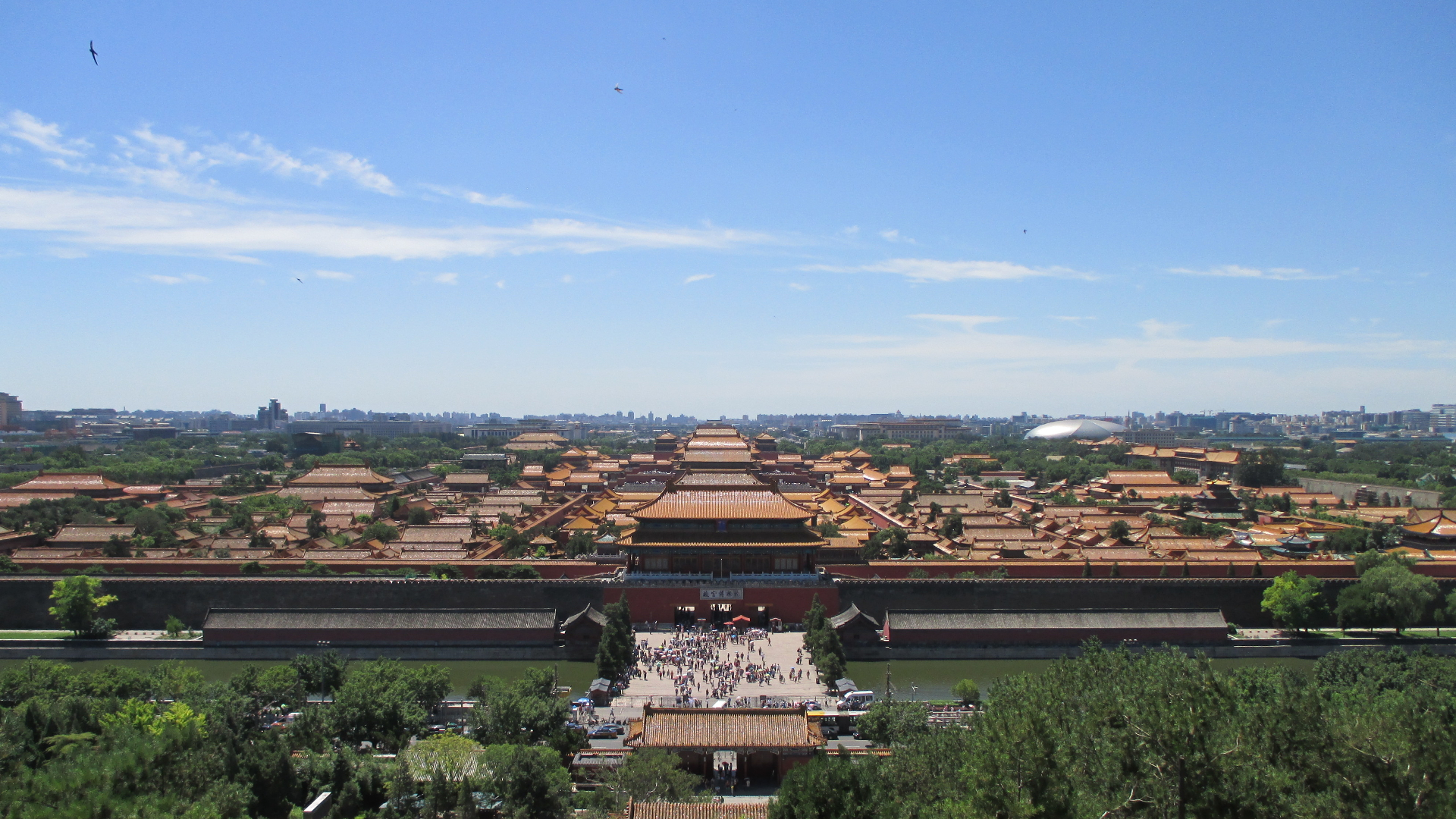
Smog diminishes visibility in Beijing. From atop Jingshan, the Forbidden City and buildings on Tiananmen Square are obscured.

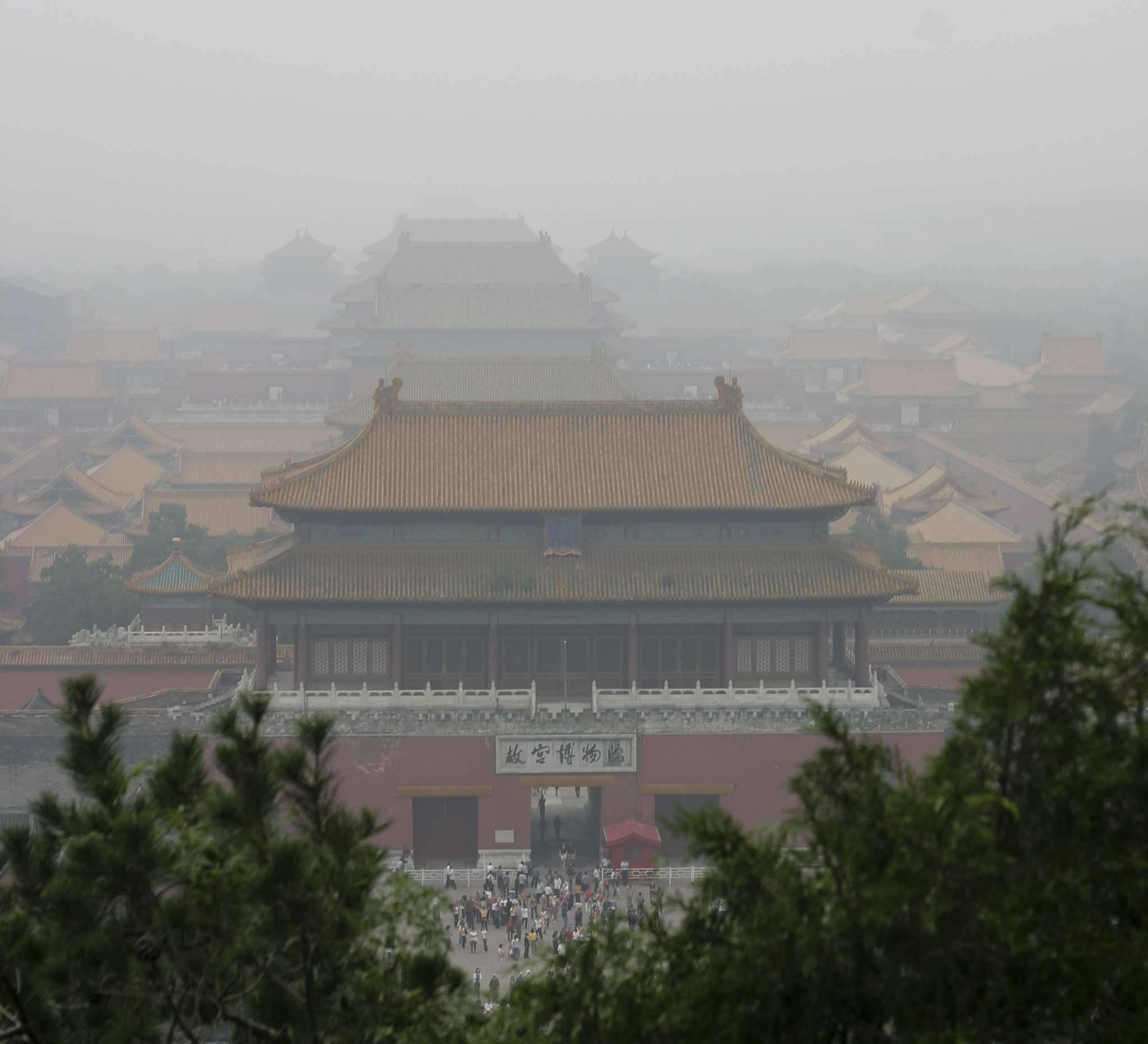

To decrease congestion and pollution, the city accelerated the expansion of the subway network. Schema showing the development of the Beijing Subway from 1971 to 2013

Rapid modernization and population growth also created numerous problems such as heavy traffic, pollution, the destruction of historic neighborhoods, and a large population of impoverished migrant workers from the countryside. By early 2005, the city government attempted to control urban sprawl by restricting development to two semicircular bands to the west and east of the city center, instead of the concentric rings of suburbs that had been built in the past.

The rapid growth of population, motor vehicles and factories has created high pollution levels. Days with gray, acrid skies, with an eye-reddening pollution score over 400, are common, as health officials advise wearing masks and staying indoors. Heavy trucks are allowed in only at night but their diesel fuels create much of the problem. By 2008 for the city's 12 million residents, pollution was not only a hazard, but a political issue tied in with the Summer Olympics scheduled for August 2008. The city's bid for the 2000 Olympics in 1993 failed partly because of high pollution levels; in response the city began a massive cleanup campaign. That campaign has been successful in terms of 2000 standards, but the city's economy is 2.5 times larger now, with millions more people. Over 3 million cars and trucks clog the streets, and 400,000 more are added annually as the wealth shoots up rapidly. Factories and power plants were changed to burn cleaner, low-sulfur coal; sulfur dioxide emissions fell by 25% 2001–2007, even though much more coal is burned, reaching 30 million tons in 2006. Furthermore, Beijing saw more than 160 million square meters (1.7 billion square feet) of new construction begun 2002–2007 due to pollution. Athletes may have some breathing problems, but in the long-run air quality is expected to remain a critical issue as the city grows beyond 20 million inhabitants. The city also imposed road space rationing, which remained in force after the Olympics.

The 2008 Summer Olympics opened on August 8, 2008, at 8:08 p.m. with a grand ceremony at the Beijing National Stadium ("Bird's Nest"). Along with 10,942 athletes from 204 countries and regions who competed in 28 sports and 302 events, leaders from 80 countries also gathered in Beijing, for the largest international event in the city's history. China, became the 22nd country to host the Olympics, and won the most gold medals for the first time. A record 86 countries medaled, with the United States topping the overall medal count. Some 1.7 million city residents volunteered during the games, setting an Olympic record. In keeping with its promise to IOC authorities that the right of public assembly would be respected during the Games, Beijing authorities designated three city parks as areas for demonstrations, but no permits for public demonstration were issued—the applications were either withdrawn or denied—and none took place.

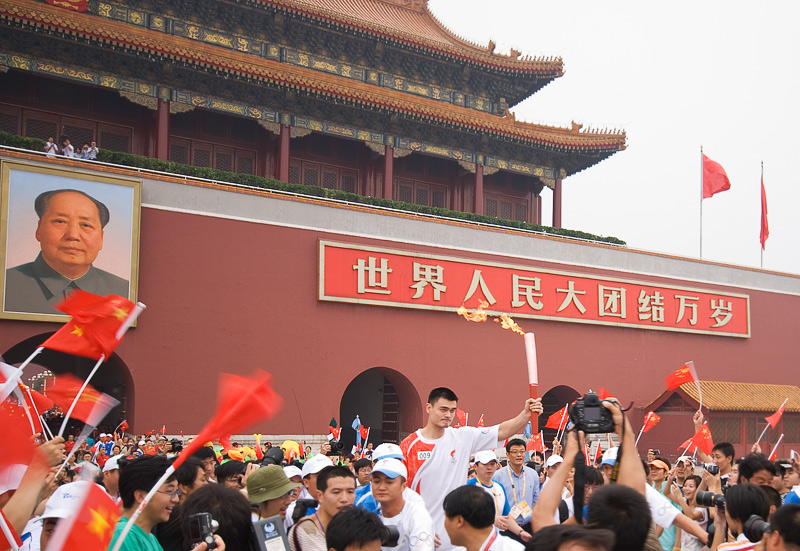
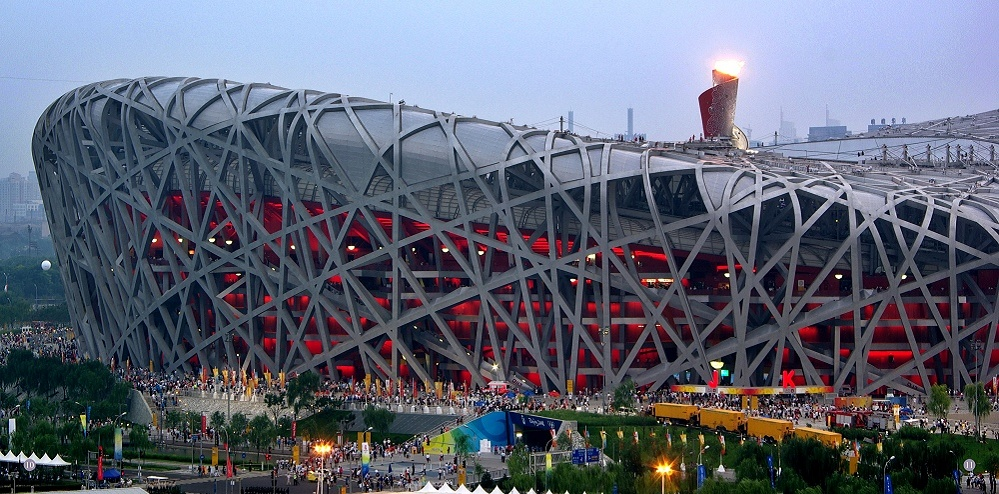
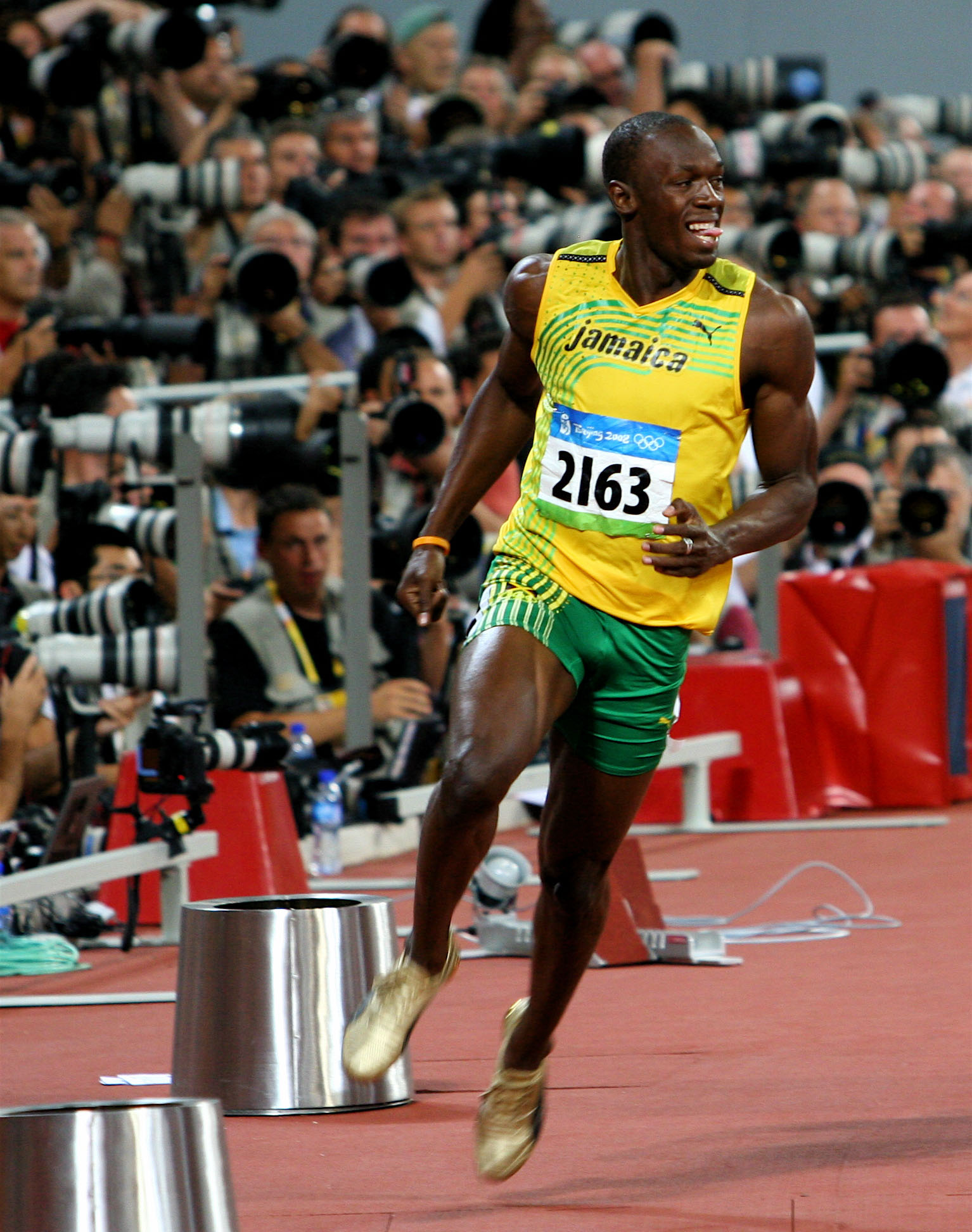
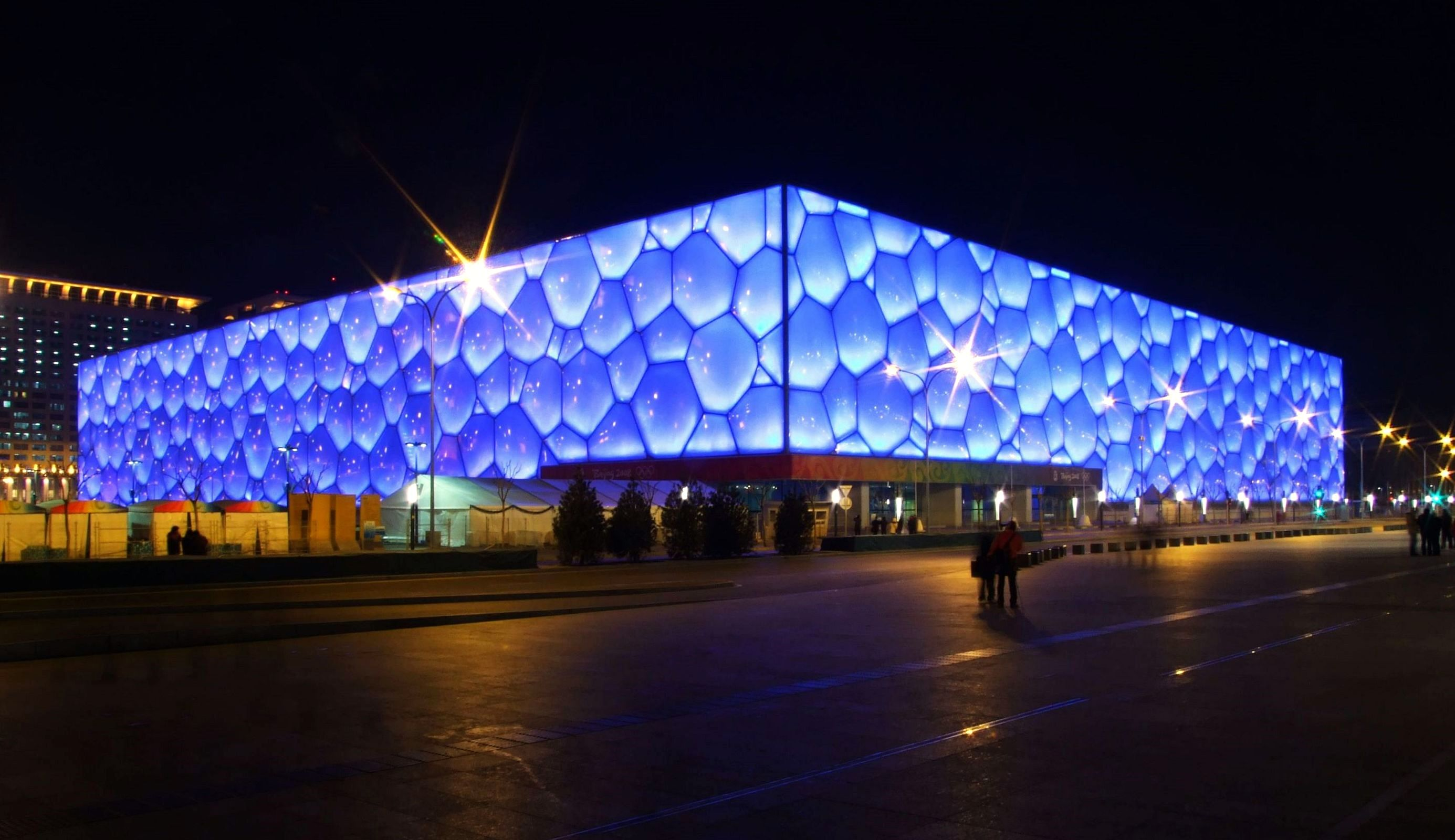
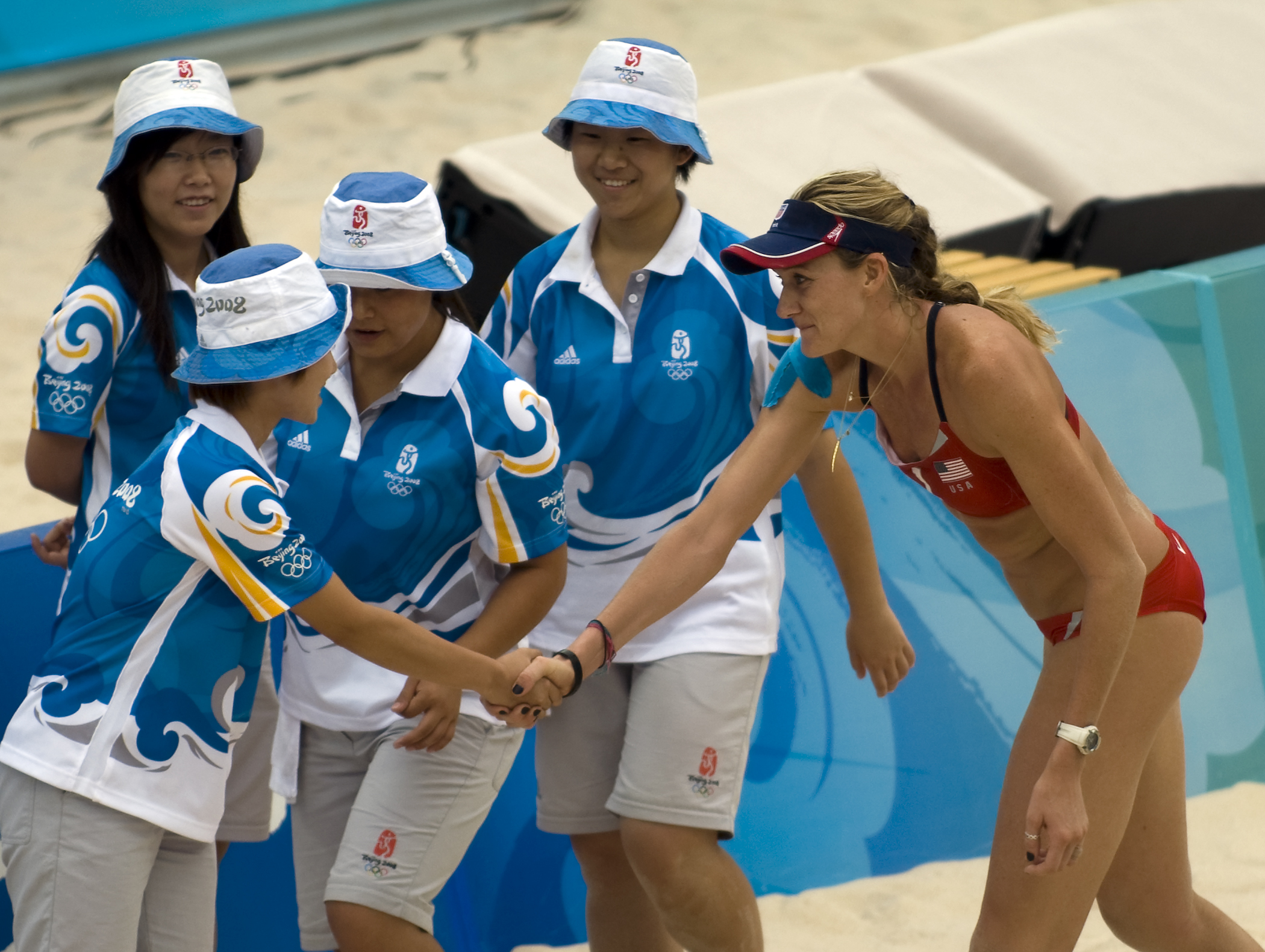
From left: (1) Yao Ming carries the Olympic torch at Tiananmen, (2) Olympic flame lit at the Bird's Nest, (3) Usain Bolt sets world record in 100 m dash, (4) The Water Cube at night, and (5) Beach volleyball gold medalist Kerri Walsh thanks Beijing volunteers.

On October 1, 2009, to commemorate the 60th anniversary of the People's Republic of China, a military parade was held on Chang'an Avenue and a gala concert in Tiananmen Square.

=== 2010s ===
In the five years after the Olympics, Beijing's economy continued to grow rapidly, and the government's massive economic stimulus program in response to the global recession added enormous wealth to the city. By the end of 2012, the city's economy was 1.8 times bigger than in 2008 and triple the size of 2004. Due to the concentration of state owned enterprises in the national capital, Beijing in 2013 had more Fortune Global 500 Company headquarters than any other city in the world. It also ranked No. 4 in the number of billionaire residents after Moscow, New York and Hong Kong.

The rapid economic growth and expansionary monetary policy, which caused property prices to rise throughout China, made Beijing one of the most expensive cities in the country. By 2010, new apartments inside the Third Ring Road cost Y30,000 per m^{2} (US$360 per sq. ft.), (Note: US dollar equivalents based USD:CNY conversion rate of Y6.7695 = US$1.00 in 2010 and Y6.1957 = $1.00 in 2013.) about ten times the average monthly wages. In response, the city government pledged to build low-income housing and imposed stringent limitations on home ownership. In February 2011, Beijing couples who already owned two or more homes and single residents with at least one home were barred from buying additional properties in the city. Individuals without resident permits, who can own only one property in the city, must pay local income tax for five consecutive years before they are eligible to buy it. In March 2013, the state imposed capital gains taxes on real estate transactions and raised down payment requirements for mortgages, but prices continued to climb. By August 2013, the average price of apartments inside the Fourth Ring Road reached Y42,259 per m^{2} (US$634 per sq. ft.), nearly twice as high as in 2009, leading to concerns of a property bubble.

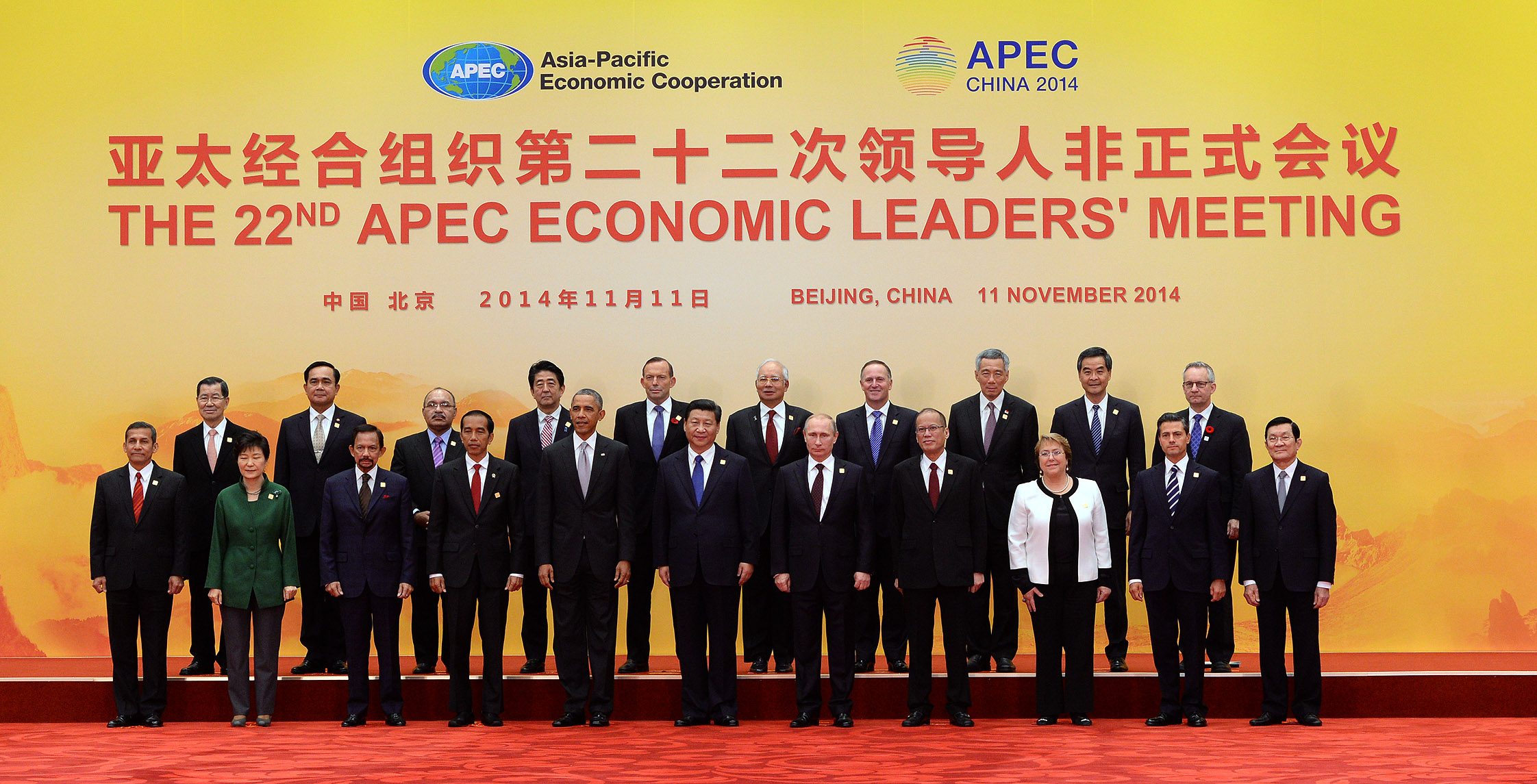
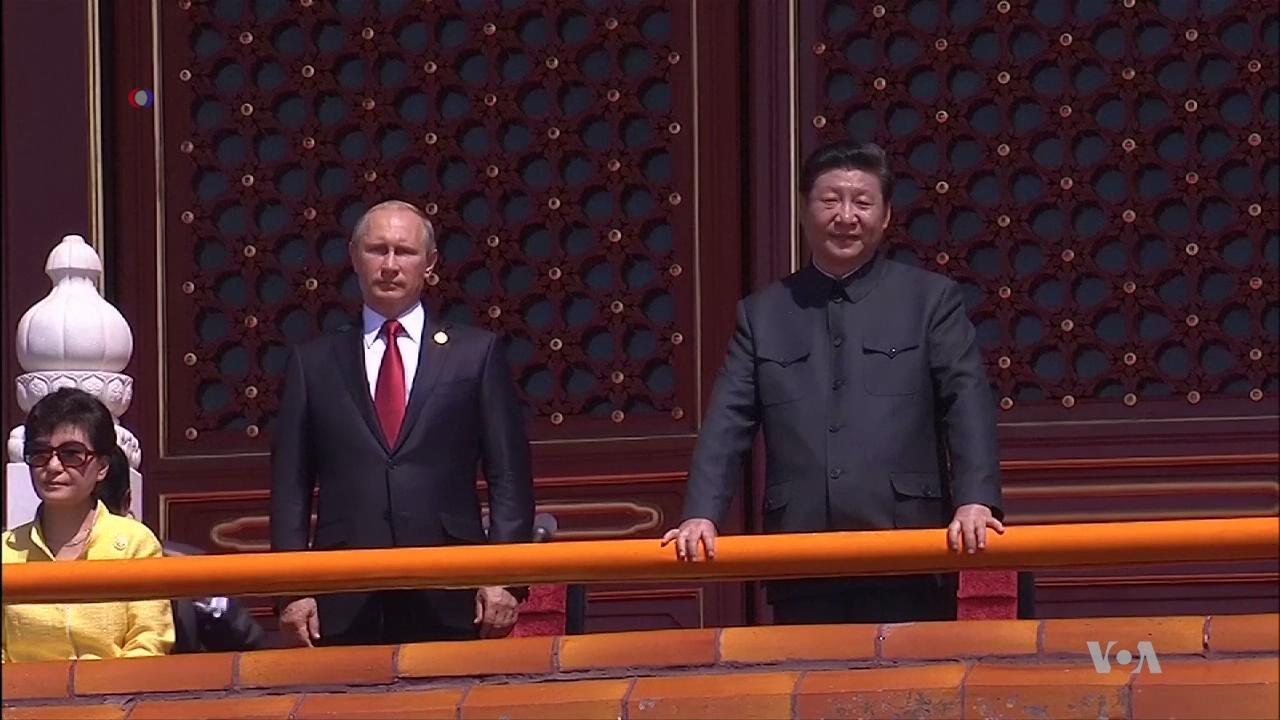
Left: World leaders gathered for the 22nd APEC Economic Leaders' Meeting on November 11, 2014. Right: From the rostrum atop Tiananmen Gate, Chinese paramount leader Xi Jinping presided over the parade commemorating the 70th anniversary of the victory in World War II, with guests of honor Russian President Vladimir Putin and South Korean President Park Geun-hye

The 22nd annual meeting of leaders from countries in the Asia-Pacific Economic Cooperation forum was held in Beijing on November 10–12, 2014. An international convention center was built by Yanqi Lake in Huairou District for the occasion. On September 3, 2015, a massive military parade was held to commemorate the 70th anniversary of the victory in World War II with leaders from over two dozen countries attending and honor guards from 17 countries joining the People's Liberation Army in the procession. On 18 November 2017, a fire killed nineteen people in Beijing in a southern industrial neighborhood. The municipal government launched a forty-day campaign to demolish "illegal structures", which housed millions of workers from foreign countries, who the government deems as Beijing's "low-end population".

== See also ==
- City of Ji
- Youzhou
- Khanbaliq (Dadu)
- Beiping
- Peking

== Bibliography ==
1. Baum, Richard (1996). Burying Mao: Chinese Politics in the Age of Deng Xiaoping. Princeton, NJ: Princeton University Press. ISBN 9780691036373.
2. Brook, Timothy. Quelling the People: The Military Suppression of the Beijing Democracy Movement. 1998. 269 pp.
3. Broudehoux, Anne-Marie. The Making and Selling of Post-Mao Beijing (2004) online edition Archived 2008-12-03 at the Wayback Machine
4. Campbell, Cameron Dougall. "Chinese Mortality Transitions: The Case of Beijing, 1700-1990." PhD dissertation U. of Pennsylvania 1995. 467 pp. DAI 1995 56(5): 1997-A. DA9532148 Fulltext: ProQuest Dissertations & Theses
5. Chinese Academy of Social Sciences (CASS) (1985). Concise Historical Atlas of China. Beijing: China Cartographic Publishing House. ISBN 7-5031-1015-5.
6. Dong, Madeleine Yue (2002). "Chapter 8: Defining Beiping - Urban Reconstruction and National Identity, 1928-1936". In Esherick, Joseph W (ed.). Remaking the Chinese City: Modernity and National Identity, 1900-1950. University of Hawaii Press. pp. 121–138. ISBN 0-8248-2518-7.
7. Dong, Madeleine Yue (2003). Republican Beijing: The City and Its Histories. University of California Press. ISBN 0-520-23050-7.
8. Dryburgh, Marjorie (2000). North China and Japanese Expansion:Regional Power and the National Interest. Routledge. ISBN 0-7007-1274-7.
9. Li, Lillian; Dray-Novey, Alison; Kong, Haili (2007). Beijing: From Imperial Capital to Olympic City. New York, United States: Palgrave Macmillan. ISBN 978-1-4039-6473-1.
10. Elliott, Mark C. (2001). The Manchu Way: The Eight Banners and Ethnic Identity in Late Imperial China. Palo Alto, California, United States: Stanford University Press. ISBN 0-8047-4684-2.
11. Geiss, James. "Beijing under the Ming (1368–1644)", Ph.D. dissertation, Princeton University, 1979.
12. Gaubatz, Piper. "Changing Beijing." Geographical Review 1995 85(1): 79–96. ISSN 0016-7428 Fulltext: in Jstor; online edition Archived 2011-09-15 at the Wayback Machine
13. Han, Guanghui (韩光辉) (1996). 北京历史人口地理 [History of the Population and Geography of Beijing] (in Simplified Chinese). Beijing: Peking University Press. ISBN 7-301-02957-8.
14. Harper, Damian, and David Eimer. Lonely Planet Beijing City Guide (2007) excerpt and text search
15. Hoare, James E. (1999), Embassies in the East: The Story of the British Embassies in Japan, China, and Korea from 1859 to the Present, British Embassy Series, vol. 1, Psychology Press, p. 70, ISBN 9780700705122
16. Hou, Renzhi (1998). The Works of Hou Renzhi. Beijing: Peking University Press.
17. Jiong, Fan (炯范) (1994). 歷史的衝融. 知書房出版集團. ISBN 957-9663-95-5.
18. MacFaquhar, Roderick; Schoenhals, Michael (2006). Mao's Last Revolution. Cambridge, Massachusetts: Belknap Press of Harvard University Press. ISBN 0-674-02332-3.
19. MacKerras, Colin; Yorke, Amanda (1991). The Cambridge Handbook of Contemporary China. Cambridge, England: Cambridge University Press. ISBN 0-521-38755-8.
20. Meyer, Jeffrey F. The Dragons of Tiananmen: Beijing as a Sacred City. 1991. 208 pp.
21. Mote, F.W. (1999). Imperial China: 900-1800. Harvard University Press. ISBN 0-674-01212-7.
22. Naquin, Susan. Peking: Temples and City Life, 1400-1900. U. of California Press, 2000. 816 pp. excerpt and text search
23. Pepper, Suzanne (1999). Civil War in China: The Political Struggle, 1945-1949. Rowman & Littlefield. pp. 174–75. ISBN 9780847691340.
24. Ratchnevsky, Paul (1993). Genghis Khan:His Life and Legacy. Wiley-Blackwell. ISBN 0-631-18949-1.
25. Shanley, Tom (2008). Dominion: Dawn of the Mongol Empire. Tom Shanley. ISBN 978-0-615-25929-1.
26. Sheehan, Brett (2002). "Chapter 4: Urban Identity and Urban Networks in Cosmopolitan Cities: Banks and Bankers in Tianjin, 1900-1937". In Esherick, Joseph W (ed.). Remaking the Chinese City: Modernity and National Identity, 1900-1950. University of Hawaii Press. pp. 47–64. ISBN 0-8248-2518-7.
27. Shi, Mingzheng. "Beijing Transforms: Urban Infrastructure, Public Works, and Social Change in the Chinese Capital, 1900-1928." PhD dissertation Columbia U. 1993. 467 pp. DAI 1994 54(7): 2699-A. DA9333861 Fulltext: ProQuest Dissertations & Theses
28. Strand, David (1993). Rickshaw Beijing: City People and Politics in the 1920s. University of California Press. ISBN 0-520-08286-9.
29. Strand, David (2002). "Chapter 2:Citizens in the Audience and at the Podium". In Goldman, Merle; Perry, Elizabeth (eds.). Changing Meanings of Citizenship in Modern China. Cambridge, Massachusetts, USA: Harvard University Press. pp. 59–60. ISBN 978-0-674-00766-6.
30. Song, Weijie. "Mapping Modern Beijing: A Literary and Cultural Topography, 1900s-1950s." PhD dissertation Columbia U. 2006. 301 pp. DAI 2006 67(4): 1346-A. DA3213600 Fulltext: ProQuest Dissertations & Theses
31. Twitchett, Denis; Fairbank, John K, eds. (1983). The Cambridge History of China. Vol. 12, Part 1. Cambridge University Press. ISBN 978-0-521-23541-9.
32. Vogel, Ezra (2011). Deng Xiaoping and the Transformation of China. Cambridge, MA: Harvard University Press. ISBN 9780674055445. - Page 254 (accessed June 18, 2013)
33. Wang, Jun (2003), 城记(北京城半个多世纪的沧桑传奇), 三联书店, ISBN 9787108018168
34. Wang, Jun (2010). Beijing Record: A Physical and Political History of Planning Modern Beijing. World Scientific. ISBN 978-981-4295-72-7.
35. Weston, Timothy B. The Power of Position: Beijing University, Intellectuals, and Chinese Political Culture, 1898-1929. 2004. 325 pp excerpt and text search; complete edition online Archived 2008-12-03 at the Wayback Machine
36. Xie, Zhonghou (谢忠厚) (2001). 华北北支（甲）第1855细菌战部队之研究. 九一八事变与近代中日关系——九一八事变70周年国际学术讨论会论文集 (in Simplified Chinese). Beijing: Social Sciences Literature Press. pp. 305–329. Archived from the original (PDF) on 2010-11-04.
37. Xu, Yamin. "Wicked Citizens and the Social Origins of China's Modern Authoritarian State: Civil Strife and Political Control in Republican Beiping, 1928-1937." PhD dissertation U. of California, Berkeley 2002. 573 pp. DAI 2003 64(2): 613-A. DA3082468 Fulltext: ProQuest Dissertations & Theses
38. Yang, Jisheng (2011). 中国改革年代的政治斗争 （Political Struggle in China's Era of Reform）. Hong Kong: Excellent Culture Press. ISBN 978-9626758038.
39. Zhu, Jianfei. Chinese Spatial Strategies: Imperial Beijing, 1420-1911 (2003) online edition Archived 2010-12-05 at the Wayback Machine
40. Wilbur, C. Martin (1983). The Nationalist Revolution in China, 1923-1928. Cambridge: Cambridge University Press. ISBN 978-0521318648.

=== Primary sources ===
1. Gamble, Sidney David; Burgess, John Stewart (1921). Peking: A Social Survey Conducted Under the Auspices of the Princeton University Center in China and the Peking Young Men's Christian Association. Google E-Book. pp. 514. ISBN 9626758031.
