= West Park =

West Park can refer to:

Australia

- West Park Oval, an Australian rules football ground in Burnie, Tasmania

China

- West Park, Beijing (Chinese: 西苑, Xīyuàn), a former imperial garden beside Taiye Lake west of the Forbidden City
- Various other places in China named Xiyuan, when translated

England

- West Park, Hartlepool, County Durham
- West Park, Darlington, County Durham
- West Park, Goole, a park in Goole, East Riding of Yorkshire
- West Park, Leeds, West Yorkshire
- West Park, Macclesfield, Cheshire
- West Park, Wolverhampton, West Midlands
- West Park, Plymouth, Devon
- West Park, Long Eaton, Derbyshire
- West Park School, Derby, Derbyshire
- West Park, house built in grounds of West Hall, Kew, Richmond, London

United States

- West Park, California, community in Fresno County
- West Park, Cleveland, neighborhood in Cleveland, Ohio
- West Park, Florida, a municipality in Broward County, Florida
- West Park, a park in Lake Forest, Illinois
- West Park High School, a public high school in Roseville, California
- West Park, New Jersey, census-designated place
- West Park, New York, town
- West Park, Pittsburgh, Pennsylvania, municipal park
- West Park, Stowe Township, neighborhood in Allegheny County, Pennsylvania

== See also ==
- Park West (disambiguation)
- Western Park (disambiguation)
- Westpark (disambiguation)
