= Westpark =

Westpark may refer to:

- Westpark (Aachen), a park in Aachen, Germany
- Westpark (Munich), a public park in Munich, Germany
  - Westpark (Munich U-Bahn), a railway station
- Westpark Cemetery, Johannesburg, South Africa
- Westpark Tollway, Houston, Texas, US
- Westpark Music, a German record label

== See also ==
- West Park (disambiguation)
- Westpark Elementary School (disambiguation)
