= Xiyuan =

Xiyuan (Chinese: 西苑, Xīyuàn, unless otherwise noted) may refer to:

- Western Garden (Taiye Lake) or Xiyuan, a former imperial garden located beside Taiye Lake west of the Forbidden City, in Xicheng District, Beijing
- Xiyuan, Haidian District, Beijing, area in Qinglongqiao Subdistrict, Haidian District, Beijing
- Xiyuan Subdistrict, Jinjiang
- Xiyuan Subdistrict, Shijiazhuang, in Xinhua District, Shijiazhuang, Hebei
- Xiyuan Subdistrict, Fuxin, in Xihe District, Fuxin, Liaoning
- Xiyuan Subdistrict, Weihai, in Huancui District, Weihai, Shandong
- Xiyuan Subdistrict, Kunming, in Xishan District, Kunming, Yunnan
- Xiyuan Temple (西园寺), or Xiyuan Jiechuanglü Temple, in Wuzhong District, Suzhou, Jiangsu
- Xiyuan Township, Jianning County (溪源乡), Fujian
- Xiyuan Township, Xianyou County, Fujian
- Xiyuan Township, Zhangping, Fujian
- Xiyuan Township, Jiangxi (西源乡), in Duchang County
- Xiyuan Road, Xitun District (西苑路), Taichung City, Taiwan

== See also ==
- Xiyuan station (disambiguation)
