= Western Park =

Western Park is the name of various areas worldwide:

- Western Park, Beijing, a former imperial park now divided into the public Beihai Park and government Zhongnanhai compound
- Western Park, Auckland, a park in Auckland, New Zealand
- Western Park, Leicester, a park in the English city of Leicester
- Western Park Warragul, a recreation reserve in the West Gippsland town of Warragul, Victoria, Australia
- Sun Yat Sen Memorial Park, formerly called Western Park, a park in Sai Ying Pun, Victoria City, Hong Kong
- Western Park, Oak Cliff, a small neighborhood in the Oak Cliff area of Dallas, Texas, United States
- Five Sisters Park, also known as the Western Park, an urban park in Warsaw, Poland

== See also ==
- West Park (disambiguation)
- Weston Park (disambiguation)
