= Weston Park (disambiguation) =

Weston Park is a country house in Staffordshire, England.

Weston Park may refer to:

- Weston Park, Sheffield – a park in Sheffield, England
- Weston Park, Canberra – a park in Australia

== Weston Hall ==
- Weston Hall, Northamptonshire, England
- Weston Hall, North Yorkshire, England
- Weston Hall, Suffolk, England

== See also ==
- Western Park (disambiguation)
