= All Saints' Church, Weston =

All Saints' Church, Weston may refer to:

- All Saints' Church, Weston, Cheshire, England
- All Saints' Church, Weston, North Yorkshire, England
- All Saints' Church, Weston, Nottinghamshire, England
- All Saints' Church, Weston, Somerset, England
- All Saints' Church, Weston-on-Avon, Warwickshire, England
