= Dadu (Beijing) =

Capital of the Yuan dynasty

Dadu Khanbaliq
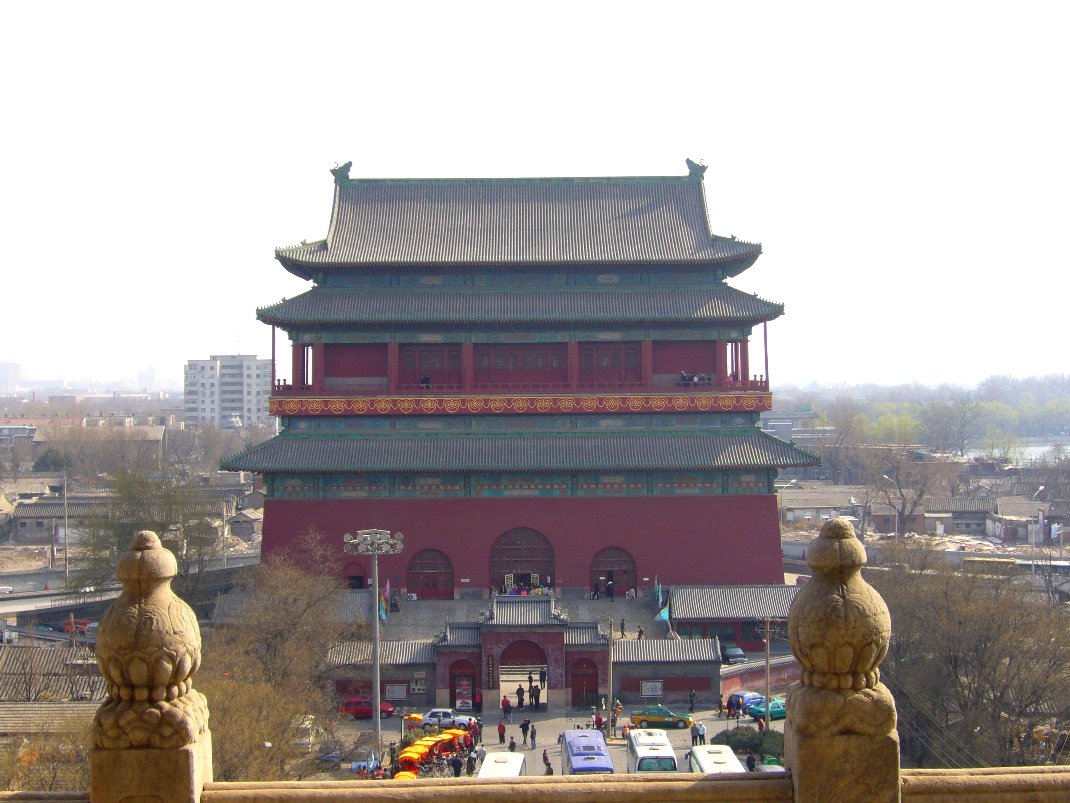

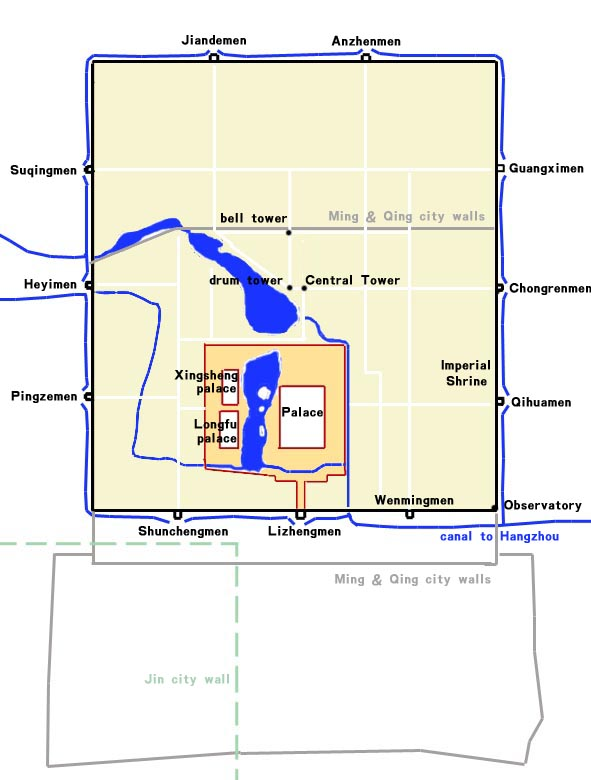
- 39°56′0″N 116°24′0″E
- Type: Former capital city
- Location: Beijing, China

History
- Founded: 1264
- Founder: Kublai Khan

Dadu

Chinese name
- Chinese: (元)大都
- Literal meaning: Grand Capital (of Yuan)
Transcriptions
Standard Mandarin
- Hanyu Pinyin: (Yuán) Dàdū
- Wade–Giles: (Yüan) Ta-tu

Mongolian name
- Mongolian script: ᠳᠠᠶ᠋ᠢᠳᠤ
Transcriptions
- SASM/GNC: Daidu

Khanbaliq

Chinese name
- Chinese: 汗八里
Transcriptions
Standard Mandarin
- Hanyu Pinyin: Hànbālǐ
- Wade–Giles: Han-pa-li

Mongolian name
- Mongolian script: ᠬᠠᠭᠠᠨ ᠪᠠᠯᠭᠠᠰᠤ
Transcriptions
- SASM/GNC: Haan balgas

Beiping
- Chinese: 北平
- Literal meaning: [Seat of the] Northern Pacified [Area]
Transcriptions
Standard Mandarin
- Hanyu Pinyin: Běipíng
- Wade–Giles: Pei-p'ing

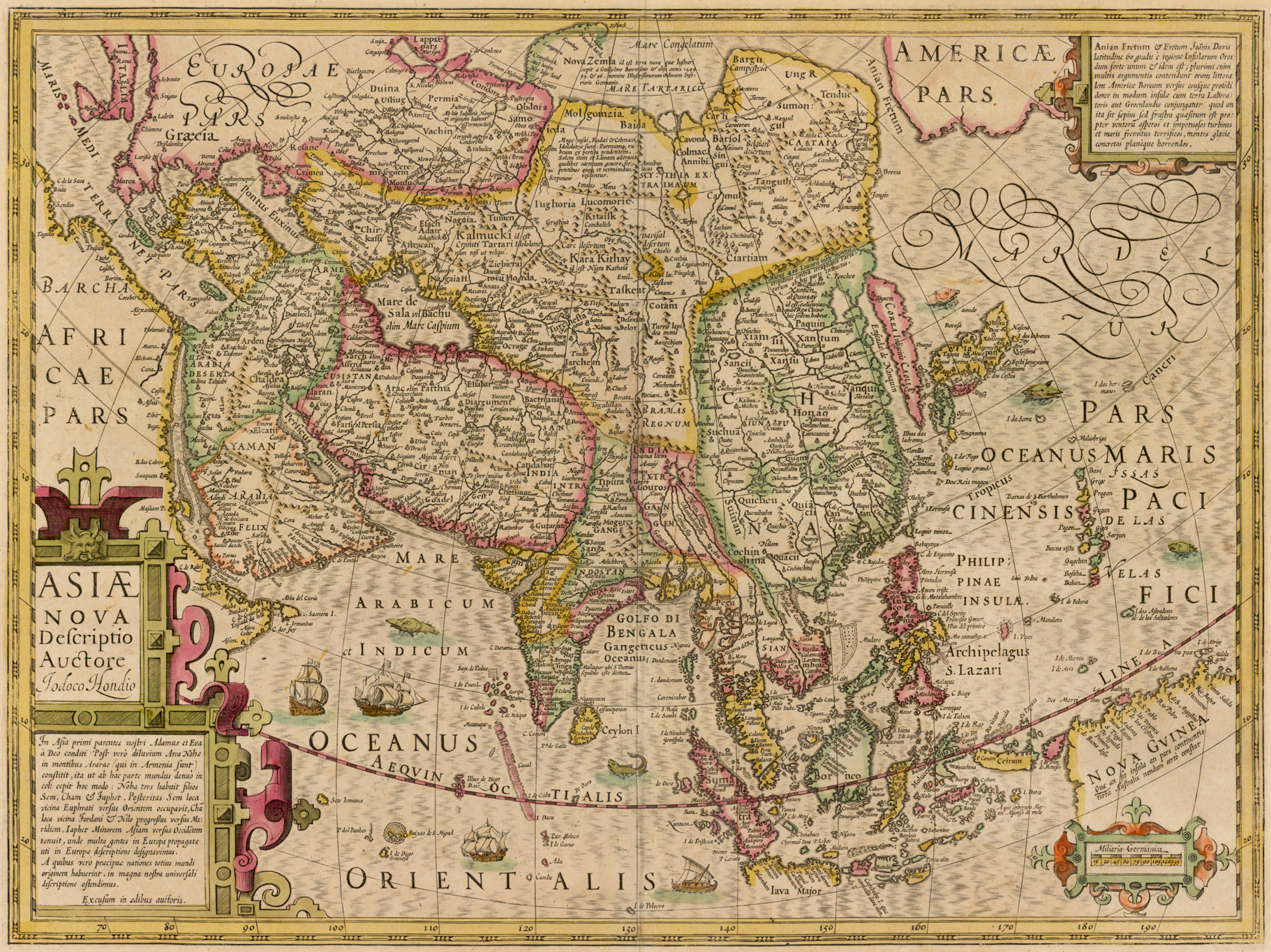
While "Cambaluc" was known to European geographers, its exact location – or its identity with Beijing – was not quite clear. This map from 1610 repeats a fairly common pattern for the period: it shows two Khanbaliqs ("Combalich" in the land of "Kitaisk" on the Ob River and "Cambalu" in "Cataia" north of the Great Wall) and one Beijing ("Paquin", at its correct location in "Xuntien" prefecture).

Dadu (Chinese: (元)大都; pinyin: (Yuán) Dàdū; Mongolian: ᠳᠠᠶ᠋ᠢᠳᠤ, Dayidu) or Khanbaliq (Chinese: 汗八里; pinyin: Hánbālǐ; Mongolian: ᠬᠠᠭᠠᠨ ᠪᠠᠯᠭᠠᠰᠤ, Qaɣan balɣasu) was the winter capital of the Mongol-led Yuan dynasty in what is now Beijing, the capital of China today. The Secretariat directly administered the Central Region (腹裏) of the Yuan dynasty (comprising present-day Beijing, Hebei, Shandong, Shanxi, and parts of Henan and Inner Mongolia) and dictated policies for the other provinces. As emperors of the Yuan dynasty, Kublai Khan and his successors also claimed supremacy over the entire Mongol Empire following the death of Möngke (Kublai's brother and predecessor) in 1259. Over time the unified empire gradually fragmented into a number of khanates.

Dadu is the direct predecessor to modern Beijing. Several stations of the modern city's subway's Line 10 and Line 13 are named after the gates of Dadu.

== Name ==
The name Dadu is the pinyin transcription of the Chinese name 大都, meaning "Grand Capital". The Mongols also called the city Daidu, which was a transliteration directly from the Chinese. In modern Chinese, it is referred to as Dadu of Yuan or Yuan Dadu to distinguish it from other cities which have similar names.

The name Khanbaliq comes from the Mongolic khan ("ruler", "king") and balik ("town", "permanent settlement"): "City of the Khan". According to Rashid al-Din, the name was actually in use among the Mongols before the Mongol conquest of the city, during the rule of the Jurchen Jin dynasty when it was officially known as Zhongdu. It is traditionally written as Cambaluc in English, after its spelling in Rustichello's retelling of Marco Polo's travels. The Travels also uses the spellings Cambuluc and Kanbalu.

== History ==
Zhongdu, the "Central Capital" of the Jurchen Jin dynasty, was located at a nearby site now part of Xicheng District. It was destroyed by Genghis Khan in 1215 when the Jin court began contemplating a move south to a more defensible capital such as Kaifeng. The Imperial Mint (诸路交钞提举司) established in 1260 and responsible for the printing of jiaochao, the Yuan fiat paper money, was probably located at nearby Yanjing even before the establishment of the new capital.

In 1264, Kublai Khan visited the Daming Palace on Jade Island in Taiye Lake and was so enchanted with the site that he directed his capital to be constructed around the garden. The chief architect and planner of the capital was Liu Bingzhong, who also served as supervisor of its construction. His student Guo Shoujing and the Muslim Ikhtiyar al-Din were also involved.

The construction of the walls of the city began in the same year, while the main imperial palace (大内) was built from 1274 onwards. The design of Dadu followed several rules laid down in the Confucian classic The Rites of Zhou, including "9 vertical and horizontal axes", "palaces in front, markets in back", "ancestral worship to the left, divine worship to the right". It was broad in scale, strict in planning and execution, and complete in equipment.

A year after the 1271 establishment of the Yuan dynasty, Kublai Khan proclaimed the city his capital under the name Dadu as it is interpreted capital city in Hanzi and named Khanbaliq as referred in the state diplomatic letters in Mongolian. The construction was not fully completed until 1293. His previous seat at Shangdu (Xanadu) became the summer capital.

As part of the Great Khans' policy of religious tolerance, Khanbaliq had various houses of worship. Almost every major religious tradition and sect in China and the wider world had a presence in the city. Orders of rabbi, Taoist sects, Mongol shamans, and various kinds of Hindu religious groups were some of the most well-known religious minorities in the city. Buddhists, Muslims, Church of the East Christians, Catholics, and Confucianists were more common.

Confucians and Taoists were extremely well-regarded by most Mongol nobles, and "some of the Mongols' most esteemed advisors were Taoists and Confucians."

It even was the seat of a Roman Catholic Archdiocese of Khanbaliq from 1307 until its 1357 suppression. It was restored in 1609 as (then) Diocese of Peking.

The Hongwu Emperor of the Ming dynasty sent an army to Dadu in 1368. The last Yuan emperor fled north to Shangdu while the Ming razed the palaces of their capital to the ground. The former capital was renamed Beiping (北平 "Pacified North") and Shuntian Prefecture was established in the area around the city.

The Hongwu Emperor was succeeded by his young grandson the Jianwen Emperor. His attempts to rein in the fiefs of his powerful uncles provoked the Jingnan Rebellion and ultimately his usurpation by his uncle, the Prince of Yan. Yan's powerbase lay in Shuntian and he quickly resolved to move his capital north from Yingtian (Nanjing) to the ruins at Beiping. He shortened the northern boundaries of the city and added a new and separately walled southern district. Upon the southern extension of the Taiye Lake (the present Nanhai), the raising of Wansui Hill over Yuan ruins, and the completion of the Forbidden City to its south, he declared the city his northern capital Beijing. With one brief interruption, it has borne the name ever since.

== Legacy ==
Ruins of the Yuan-era walls of Dadu are still extant and are known as the Tucheng (土城), lit. "earth wall". Tucheng Park preserves part of the old northern walls, along with some modern statues.

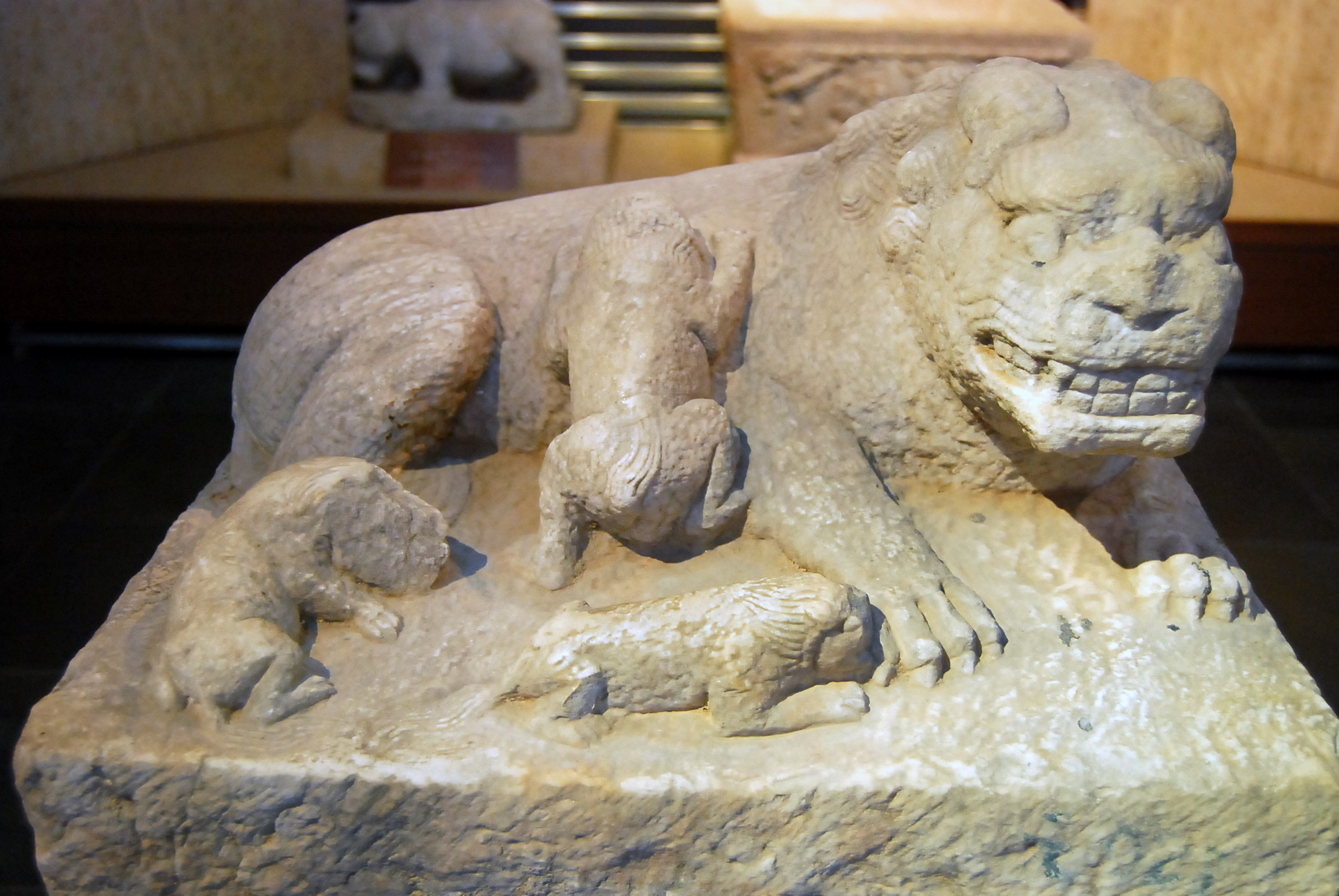
A sculpture of a lion with three cubs from Khanbaliq, discovered beneath the Ming-era city wall and now on display at the Beijing Stone Carving Museum

Despite the capture and renaming of the city by the Ming, the name Daidu remained in use among the Mongols of the Mongolia-based Northern Yuan dynasty. The lament of the last Yuan emperor, Toghon Temür, concerning the loss of Khanbaliq and Shangdu, is recorded in many Mongolian historical chronicles such as the Altan Tobchi and the Asarayci Neretu-yin Teuke.

Khanbaliq remained the standard name for Beijing in Persian and the Turkic languages of Central Asia and the Middle East for quite a long time. It was, for instance, the name used in both the Persian and Turkic versions of Ghiyāth al-dīn Naqqāsh's account of the 1419–22 mission of Shah Rukh's envoys to the Ming capital. The account remained one of the most detailed and widely read accounts of China in these languages for centuries.

When European travelers reached China by sea via Malacca and the Philippines in the 16th century, they were not initially aware that China was the same country as the "Cathay" about which they had read in Marco Polo nor that his "Cambaluc" was the city known to the southern Chinese as Pekin. It was not until the Jesuit Matteo Ricci's first visit to Beijing in 1598 that he encountered Central Asian visitors ("Arabian Turks, or Mohammedans" in his description) who confirmed that the city they were in was "Cambaluc." The publication of his journals by his aide announced to Europe that "Cathay" was China and "Cambaluc" Beijing. The journal then fancifully explained that name was "partly of Chinese and partly of Tartar origin", from "Tartar" cam ("great"), Chinese ba ("north"), and Chinese Lu (used for nomads in Chinese literature). Many European maps continued to show "Cathay" and its capital "Cambaluc" somewhere in northeast China for much of the 17th century.

== See also ==
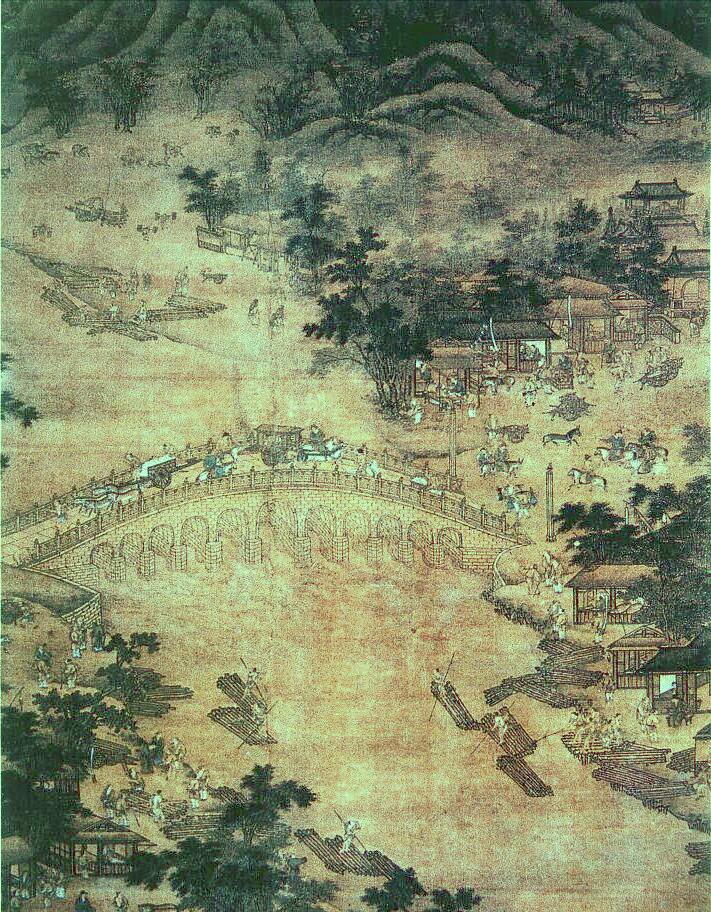
Workers moving material to construct Khanbaliq

- History of Beijing
- Names of Beijing
- Shangdu
- Yuan Dadu City Wall Ruins Park
