= Listed buildings in Weston, North Yorkshire =

Weston is a civil parish in the county of North Yorkshire, England. It contains 16 listed buildings that are recorded in the National Heritage List for England. Of these, three are listed at Grade I, the highest of the three grades, one is at Grade II*, the middle grade, and the others are at Grade II, the lowest grade. The parish contains the village of Weston and the surrounding area. A major building in the parish is the country house, Weston Hall, which is listed together with associated structures in its grounds. The other listed buildings include a church, items in the churchyard, houses, farmhouses and farm buildings.

== Key ==
Grade	Criteria
I	Buildings of exceptional interest, sometimes considered to be internationally important
II*	Particularly important buildings of more than special interest
II	Buildings of national importance and special interest

== Buildings ==
Name and location	Photograph	Date	Notes	Grade
All Saints' Church; 53.91547°N 1.73141°W		12th century	The church has been altered and extended through the centuries. It is built in gritstone with a stone slate roof, and consists of a nave with a south porch and a north aisle, and a chancel with a family pew on the north. On the west gable is a square bellcote with two arches, and at the west end are massive stepped buttresses. The south porch has a coped gable, and contains a doorway with an eared architrave, a dated keystone and a cornice, and the inner entrance has a round arch.	I
Barn south of Weston Hall; 53.91597°N 1.73099°W		16th century (or before)	The barn has a timber framed core, it was encased in gritstone in the 17th century, and later converted into stables and a coach house. It has quoins and a stone slate roof with shaped kneelers and gable copings, and there are five bays and double aisles. The openings include doorways, windows, some with mullions, a pitching door and vents.	II*
Weston Hall; 53.91622°N 1.73060°W		c. 1600	A country house that has been altered and extended. It is in gritstone with quoins and a roof of gritstone slabs. There is a main image of two storeys and a basement and four bays, to the south is a projecting range with two storeys and a basement, and fronts of three and four bays, and to the north is a bay with three storeys and a basement. On the garden front, the main range has a staircase of opposing stairs leading to a pair of round-arched doorways with a cornice on consoles, under which are two round-arched basement windows. The other windows are mullioned with cornices, and above is a deep eaves cornice and a blocking course. The left range contains sash windows on the ground floor, above which is a mullioned and a mullioned and transomed window, and a balustrade. The right bay contains three tiers of canted mullioned and transomed bay windows with hood moulds, above which is a blind window, a gabled parapet and tall crocketed pinnacles.	I
Banqueting House, Weston Hall; 53.91647°N 1.72958°W		c. 1600	The building is in gritstone on a plinth, with quoins and a stone slate roof. It consists of a three-storey one-bay tower with a projecting rear stair turret surmounted by a gazebo. On the south front is a doorway with a triangular head and a cornice. The upper floors each contains a five-light mullioned and transomed bay window with cornices, the upper windows flanked by roundels. On the left return external steps lead to a doorway on the stair turret, to the right are two recesses containing gadrooned urns, and above are mullioned and transomed windows. All the windows are recessed and have moulded surrounds.	I
Hall Farmhouse and outbuildings 53.91887°N 1.73075°W	—	Mid to late 17th century	The farmhouse is in gritstone, with quoins, and a stone slate roof with a shaped kneeler and coped gable on the right. There are two doorways, one with a quoined surround, the ground floor windows are sashes, and on the upper floor are casement windows and two blocked rectangular windows.	II
Table tomb, All Saints' Church; 53.91533°N 1.73132°W	—	1669	The tomb is in the churchyard, to the south of the church, and is in gritstone. It consists of two large slabs with a moulded edge, on a low plinth. Each slab has an inscription.	II
Group of three table tombs, All Saints' Church; 53.91546°N 1.73100°W	—	Late 17th century	The tombs are in the churchyard, to the east of the church. They are in gritstone, and each consists of a slab on a moulded plinth. All have inscriptions, but only one is legible.	II
Weston Grange; 53.91881°N 1.72873°W	—	Late 17th century	The house, which has been extended, is in gritstone, with chamfered quoins on the left, a moulded string course, and a stone slate roof with a shaped kneeler and gable coping on the right. There are two storeys, five bays, an extension of two bays and a two-bay rear wing. In the centre of the main block is a doorway with an architrave flanked by canted bay windows, and the other windows are mullioned. At the rear is a doorway with a chamfered surround and a moulded arch, and the wing has cross windows.	II
Barn opposite Hall Farmhouse; 53.91872°N 1.73030°W	—	18th century	The barn is in gritstone, with quoins, and a stone slate roof with bulbous kneelers and gable copings. There are about five bays, and it contains a cart entrance with quoined jambs and a cambered arch, and square vents.	II
East gate, piers and railings, Weston Hall; 53.91399°N 1.71745°W		Mid-18th century (probable)	The gates, gate piers and railings are in wrought iron and date from the 19th century. The outer piers are earlier, they are about 3.5 metres (11 ft) in height, and have a square plan, each with a central pilaster strip, a moulded entablature, and a deep cornice surmounted by a gadrooned urn.	II
Dob Park House; 53.94274°N 1.70622°W	—	Mid to late 18th century	The house is in gritstone, with quoins, and a stone slate roof with shaped kneelers, and gable copings. There are two storeys and two bays. The central doorway has a plain surround, and the windows are mullioned with three lights.	II
Low Park Farmhouse and barn 53.95109°N 1.71214°W	—	Mid to late 18th century	The farmhouse and barn are in gritstone with quoins and stone slate roofs. The house has two storeys and two bays, and a rear outshut. The central doorway has tie-stone jambs, and the windows are millioned, each with one mullion removed. The barn has four bays, and contains a cart entrance with a quoined surround and a cambered arch, and slit vents.	II
Stable and byre range, Low Park Farm; 53.95129°N 1.71194°W	—	Mid to late 18th century	The stable and byre range have a granary and storage above. They are in gritstone with a corrugated asbestos roof, and have two storeys and five bays. The building contains three doorways with tie-stone jambs, and a square pitching door on the far left. External steps lead up to a door on the right.	II
Sundial, All Saints' Church; 53.91540°N 1.73140°W	—	Late 18th century (probable)	The sundial in the churchyard, to the south of the church, is in gritstone. It has a square base, the shaft is a deeply fluted column, and it has a moulded cap.	II
Outbuilding and wall north of Weston Hall; 53.91637°N 1.73072°W	—	Late 18th century	The outbuilding, which incorporates earlier features, is in gritstone, with quoins, and a stone slate roof with bulbous kneelers and moulded gable coping. There are two storeys and four bays, and it contains three doorways with plain surrounds, and mullioned windows. The building is linked to the hall by a wall about 2 metres (6 ft 7 in) in height containing a shallow triangular-headed doorway with a chamfered quoined surround.	II
Ice house, Weston Hall; 53.91693°N 1.73035°W	—	1838	The ice house is in gritstone with a brick lining. The outer doorway has a plain surround and a dated lintel, and a short passage leads to two inner doorways. Inside there is a circular sunken chamber with a domed roof, about 5 metres (16 ft) in depth.	II
