= Emperor Zhangzong of Jin =

Emperor of Jin from 1189 to 1208

Emperor Zhangzong of Jin 金章宗
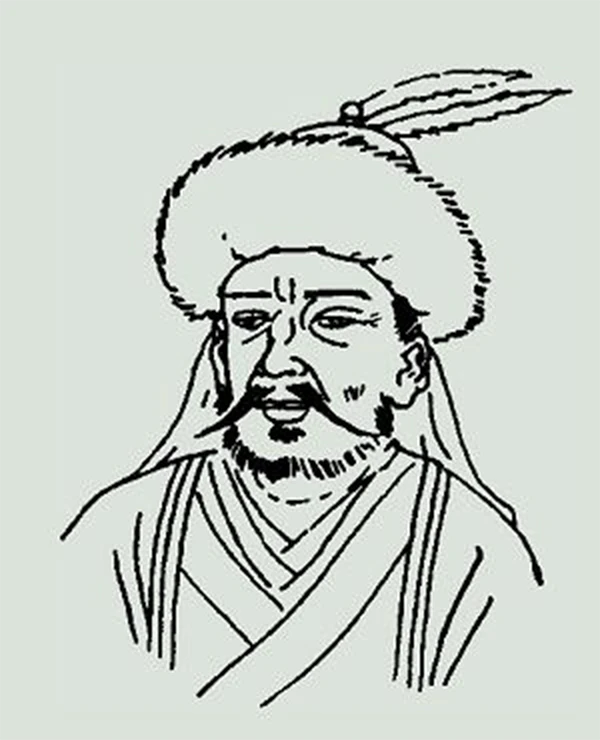

Emperor of the Jin dynasty
- Reign: 20 January 1189 – 29 December 1208
- Predecessor: Emperor Shizong
- Successor: Wanyan Yongji
- Born: 31 August 1168
- Died: 29 December 1208 (aged 40)
- Burial: Dao Mausoleum (道陵, in present-day Fangshan District, Beijing)
- Spouse: Empress Qinhuai; Li Shi'er; others
- Issue: See § Family
Names
- Sinicized name: Wanyan Jing (完顏璟); Jurchen name: Madage (麻達葛)
Era dates
- Mingchang (明昌): 1190—1196; Cheng'an (承安): 1196—1200; Taihe (泰和): 1201—1208
Posthumous name
- Emperor Xiantian Guangyun Renwen Yiwu Shensheng Yingxiao (憲天光運仁文義武神聖英孝皇帝)
Temple name
- Zhangzong (章宗)
- House: Wanyan
- Dynasty: Jin
- Father: Wanyan Yungong
- Mother: Empress Xiaoyi

Emperor Zhangzong of Jin
- Chinese: 金章宗
Transcriptions
Standard Mandarin
- Hanyu Pinyin: Jīn Zhāngzōng

Madage
- Traditional Chinese: 麻達葛
- Simplified Chinese: 麻达葛
Transcriptions
Standard Mandarin
- Hanyu Pinyin: Mádágé

Wanyan Jing
- Traditional Chinese: 完顏璟
- Simplified Chinese: 完颜璟
Transcriptions
Standard Mandarin
- Hanyu Pinyin: Wányán Jǐng

Emperor Zhangzong of Jin (31 August 1168 – 29 December 1208), personal name Madage, sinicized name Wanyan Jing, was the sixth emperor of the Jurchen-led Jin dynasty of China. He reigned from 20 January 1189 to 29 December 1208.

During his rule, he is credited for ordering the construction of the beautiful Taiye Lake, an artificial lake in Beijing, that remains to this day. He also established many Confucian temples throughout Northeast China and was tolerant of both Han and Jurchen cultures and customs. However, the Jin dynasty began to decline as he started neglecting governmental affairs and showing favoritism to one of his concubines Li Shi'er and her family members in political office. The Tatar confederation who once allied with the Jin dynasty rebelled and joined the rising Mongol Empire. The Southern Song chancellor Han Tuozhou tried to take advantage of Madage's incompetency by launching an attack on the Jin. However the Jin dynasty defeated the Southern Song, and the Southern Song was forced to pay restitution and execute Han Tuozhou for the Jin.

Madage died shortly after the Song's failed invasion and was succeeded by yet another incompetent ruler. Seeing the declining state of the Jin dynasty under Madage and his successor, Genghis Khan launched an invasion on the Jin shortly after Madage's death. The Yuan dynasty would ultimately conquer both the Jin and Southern Song dynasties, reunifying China after centuries of war between the various empires.

== Life ==
=== Early life ===
Emperor Zhangzong was the sixth emperor of the Jin dynasty. He inherited the throne from his grandfather, Emperor Shizong and was succeeded by Wanyan Yongji.

To some extent, Emperor Zhangzong continued his grandfather's policy of encouraging intensive use of the Jurchen language and promotion of Jurchen customs. He forbade wearing of Han Chinese clothes and required his subjects to perform the Jurchen kowtow ceremony. He required his meng'an and mouke (Jurchen hereditary feudal nobility) to take an archery test if they wanted to sit for a jinshi examination. On the other hand, he permitted Jurchens to follow Han Chinese funeral practices, and Tang and Song dynasty rituals are known to have been performed at his court in 1194.

Resuming one of the projects of the Prince of Hailing, Emperor Zhangzong established Confucian temples in all prefectures and counties of his empire.

Emperor Zhangzong ordered the construction of the Taiye Lake in Beijing for him to go fishing. Unlike his grandfather, Emperor Zhangzong did not consider hunting as a natural and necessary way of military training but viewed it as recreation.

One of Emperor Zhangzong's concubines was Li Shi'er (李師兒). Zhangzong once romanced Concubine Li on Qiong Island (瓊島), where Concubine Li said that the emperor was like the sun (日), while she was the moon (月). Together, they make the character for "bright" (明). Emperor Zhangzong in his later years began to spoil Concubine Li and gave her family members positions in the government, while ignoring his duties as the emperor. As such, the Jin Empire began to decline during his reign.

In 1196, the Tatar confederation who were originally part of the Jin dynasty revolted and allied with the Mongols. Seeing that the Jin dynasty was declining, the Southern Song chancellor Han Tuozhou sought to capitalize on the opportunity to launch an attack on the Jin. Han Tuozhou ultimately failed and was executed.

=== Failed Song invasion of the Jin ===
When, in 1206, the troops of the Southern Song chancellor Han Tuozhou invaded the Jin dynasty, trying to reunify China from the south, Emperor Zhangzong's armies defeated the invaders.

The conflict began when the Song were informed of Jurchen troubles with the rising Mongols and natural disasters. The Song began provoking Emperor Zhangzong in 1204 and onward by orchestrating raids on Jin settlements. The fighting continued to escalate, partly aggravated by Song officials in support of revanchism, and war against the Jin dynasty was officially declared on June 14, 1206.

The Song advance was impeded by Jin military successes and declining soldier morale that forced many to desert. By the fall of 1206, multiple towns and military bases had been captured by the Jurchens. Neither side was willing to continue fighting, and a peace treaty was signed on November 2, 1208. To obtain peace, the Song dynasty had to yield territory, pay an indemnity, and execute the hawkish Han Tuozhou. The Song dynasty was obligated to pay an annual tribute of 50,000 taels of silver and 50,000 packs of fabric. They also delivered the severed heads of Han Tuozhou and Su Shidan for instigating the war to the Jurchens.

=== Late life ===
In December 29, 1208, Jin Zhangzong died. All six of his sons died before the age of three. Without any heirs, he was succeeded by his uncle Wanyan Yongji instead. After Yongji ascended the throne, Genghis Khan knew that Wanyan Yongji was incompetent, so he immediately sent his army south to invade the Jin Dynasty in the following year.

Jin Zhangzong's posthumous title was Xiantian Guangyun Renwen Yiwu Shensheng Yingxiao Emperor (憲天光運仁文義武神聖英孝皇帝). He was buried in Daoling (道陵).

== Family ==
Parents

- Father: Hutuwa (胡土瓦), sinicized name Wanyan Yungong (完顏允恭), Emperor Shizong's second son and heir apparent, posthumously honored as Emperor Xianzong (金顯宗)
- Mother: Lady Tudan (徒單氏), posthumously honored as Empress Xiaoyi (孝懿皇后)

Consort and issue(s):

- Empress Qinhuai, of the Pucha clan (欽懷皇后 蒲察氏; d.1189)
  - Wanyan Hongyu, Prince of Jiang (絳王 完顏洪裕, 1186 — 25 October 1188), 1st son
- First Consort, of the Li clan (元妃 李氏, d. 1209), personal name Shi'er (師兒)
  - Wanyan Telin, Prince of Ge (葛王 完颜忒邻, 1202 – 1203 ), 6th son
- Zhaoyi of the Jiagu clan (昭儀 夾谷氏), Jiagu Qingchen's (夾谷清臣) daughter
- Furen Ziming, of the Lin clan (資明夫人 林氏)
  - Wanyan Hongjing, Prince of Jing (荊王 完顏洪靖, 1192 – 1193), 2nd son
- Chengyu, of the Jia (承御賈氏)
  - misscariage (1208)
- Chengyu, of the Fan clan (承御范氏)
  - Princess of Shun (順國公主), 3rd daughter
- Unknown:
  - Wanyan Hongxi, Prince of Rong (榮王 完顏洪熙, 1192 – 1193), 3rd son
  - Wanyan Hongyan, Prince of Ying (英王 完顏洪衍, 1193 – 1193), 4th son
  - Wanyan Honghui, Prince of Shou (壽王 完顏洪輝, 3 June 1197 – 28 November 1197), 5th son
