= Park West =

Park West may refer to:

Locations

- Central Park West, New York City, a street
- Park West, Dublin, a business park
  - Park West and Cherry Orchard railway station, Dublin
- Park West (Miami), a neighborhood
- Park West (music venue) in Chicago, Illinois
- ParkWest, a ski resort and music venue in Park City, Utah, now known as Canyons Resort

Businesses

- Park West Gallery, Southfield, Michigan, an art gallery

== See also ==
- West Park (disambiguation)
