= Weston, North Yorkshire =

Village and civil parish in North Yorkshire, England

Coordinates: 53°55′10″N 1°43′46″W

Weston
- Location within North Yorkshire
- Population: 209 (2011)
- OS grid reference: SE178470
- Unitary authority: North Yorkshire
- Ceremonial county: North Yorkshire
- Region: Yorkshire and the Humber
- Country: England
- Sovereign state: United Kingdom
- Post town: OTLEY
- Postcode district: LS21
- Police: North Yorkshire
- Fire: North Yorkshire
- Ambulance: Yorkshire

Weston is a village and civil parish in the county of North Yorkshire, England. The village is 1.2 miles (2 km) north–west of Otley and near the River Wharfe which forms the boundary between North and West Yorkshire. The name is from Old English and means western enclosure, farmstead or village.

The village is less than a mile north-east of Burley-in-Wharfedale across the River Wharfe, but there is no direct access across the river. Access to Weston village is by an unclassified road (Weston Lane) from Otley and from Askwith and Ilkley to the west.

The village of Weston should not be confused with the nearby Weston Estate, a housing estate around Weston Lane between Weston and Newall, within Otley and West Yorkshire.

The civil parish extends some 2.5 miles (4.0 km) north of the village to the River Washburn. Much of the northern part of the parish is an estate including commercial premises and farmland, also known as the Weston Estate. To the south of the village, Weston Hall is part of the Askwith Estate adjoining the north bank of the River Wharfe.

Until 1974 it was part of the West Riding of Yorkshire. From 1974 to 2023 it was part of the Borough of Harrogate, it is now administered by the unitary North Yorkshire Council.

== History ==
All Saints' Church is recorded in the Domesday Book, although there is evidence of Christian worship before this time (most notably that of a 9th-century cross that was found in the graveyard). The church is mostly Norman with some 17th and 19th century additions and was Grade I listed in 1966. The church bells were stolen in March 1990 and when they were eventually retrieved, expert analysis revealed them to be amongst the oldest bells in Britain, with one dating from at least the year 1200. Heritage Lottery Funding was successfully applied for and after careful restoration, the bells were re-hung in the church in October 2016.

Farming has been the main occupation of the inhabitants of Weston for many centuries and the appealing rural nature of the area has been noted as part of the Nidderdale Area of Outstanding Natural Beauty, which was signified in 1994.

Land at the eastern end of the village (known as Gallows Hill) which adjoins the Weston housing estate, was used during the Second World War and beyond until 1948 to house German Prisoners of War. Most of the site was destroyed to make way for the new housing estate.

=== Lords of the manor ===
Before the Domesday book was collated, the area was originally part of Otley Manor, but was then separated off north of the river. After Domesday, the estate was granted to Berenger de Tosny. According to the national archives, the archived documents for Weston "relate chiefly to the Yorkshire estates of the Vavasours of Weston from whom they have descended to the present owner. The property was built-up by Sir Brian de Lisle (Latinized as de Insula), who died in 1234, and by his nephew Sir Robert de Stopham (died before 1275). The Stophams seem to have originated in Sussex and Dorset and the Yorkshire branch to have been established by the Lisle inheritance." "Sir Robert de Stopham's daughter Maud married John le Vavasour of Denton, to whose descendents the property passed on the failure of the Stopham line in the middle of the fourteenth century. It then comprised the manors of Weston and Newton (in the parish of Nidd) and other lands at Burley-in-Wharfedale and Baildon. The last of the Baildon property appears to have been sold c. 1700 and that at Newton in 1795."

In 1833, William Vavasour died and the estate passed onto his nephew (William Elmsall Carter) who was an attorney from Lincoln. Carter died the following year in 1834 and his daughters (Emma Carter and Susan Carter) inherited the estate. Emma Carter married Christopher Holdsworth Dawson, whose grandfather was one of the founders of the Low Moor Ironworks, and Susan married William Millthorpe Spence M.D. Through these marriages, the estate was split and passed down through the Vavasour Dawson line to Herbrand Vavasour Dawson and the Carter Spence line to Malger Powis Vavasour as joint Lords of the Manor of Weston.

=== Weston Hall and Weston Manor ===
Weston Hall is a Tudor and Georgian country house containing several many grand rooms, including the Dragon Room, so-called for the plaster sculpting in the ceiling. There is a second building, formerly used by the men of the estate for playing snooker and telling tales. There is also a small church on the property, built in the 1200s and holding many old records.

Weston Manor is a substantial Victorian country house built of stone with a Westmoreland slate roof. Dating from 1899 the present property replaced Deanfield House and was built to the design of Kilnwick Hall in the East Riding of Yorkshire with the addition of the Tower on the front elevation, which emulated one of the principal features of Deanfield house.

== Dob Park ==
Dob Park was a medieval deer park in the north of the parish. The only visible remains of the park are the ruins of Deer Park Lodge, a Scheduled Ancient Monument which is located in an isolated position on private land. It dates from the early 17th century and was commissioned by Sir Mauger Vavasour. It may have fallen into disuse fairly quickly, however, and was close to its current ruinous state when it was painted by J M W Turner (“Washburn under Folly Hall”) in around 1815. In January 2019 permission was granted for the conversion of the building into a residence.

On the River Washburn below the lodge is a packhorse bridge, probably dating from the early 17th century, which carried an ancient routeway over the river to Norwood and Fewston. It is a Grade II listed building.

== See also ==
- Listed buildings in Weston, North Yorkshire

== Gallery ==
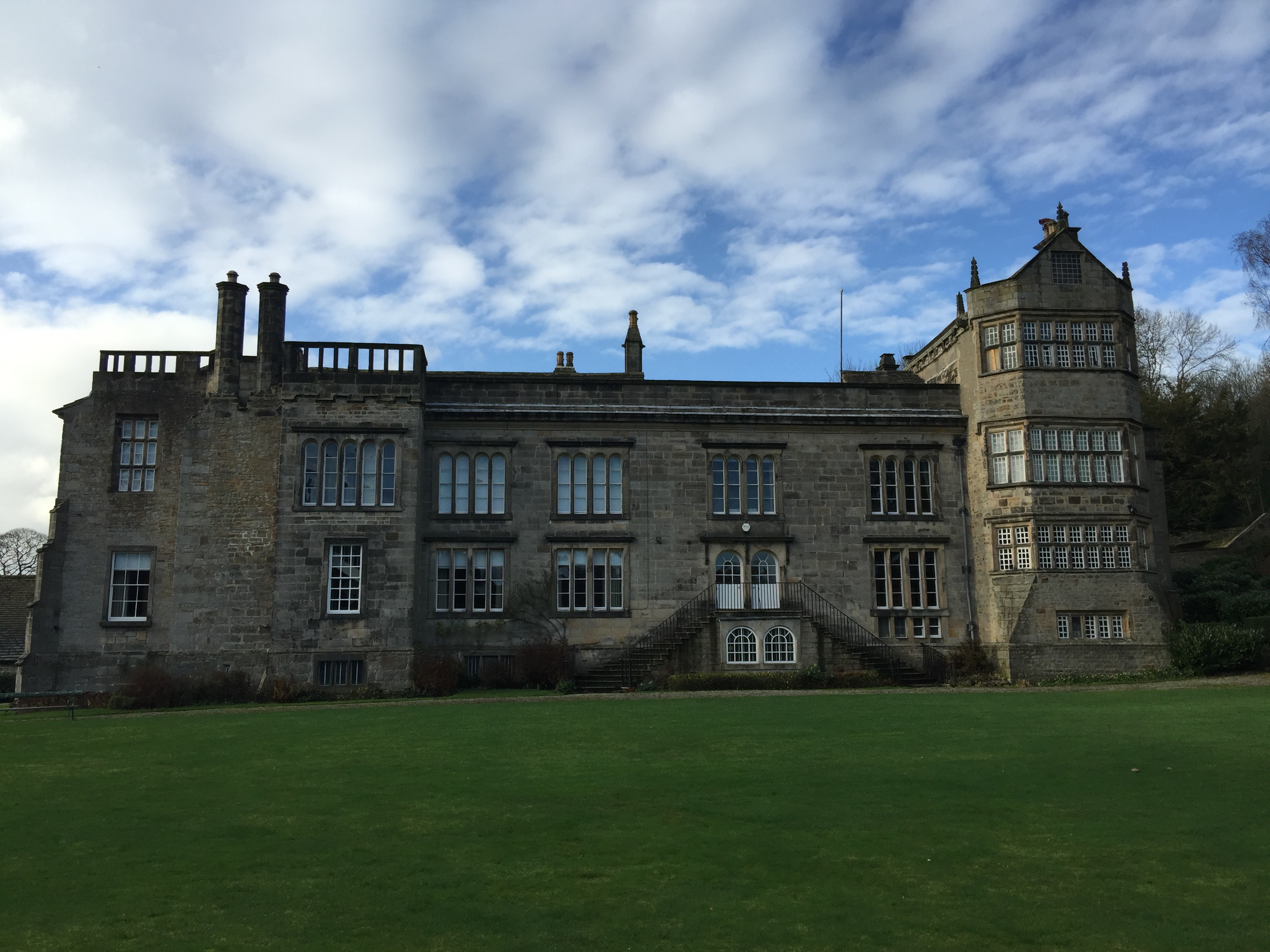
This is the main Weston Hall estate as viewed from the lawn in front.

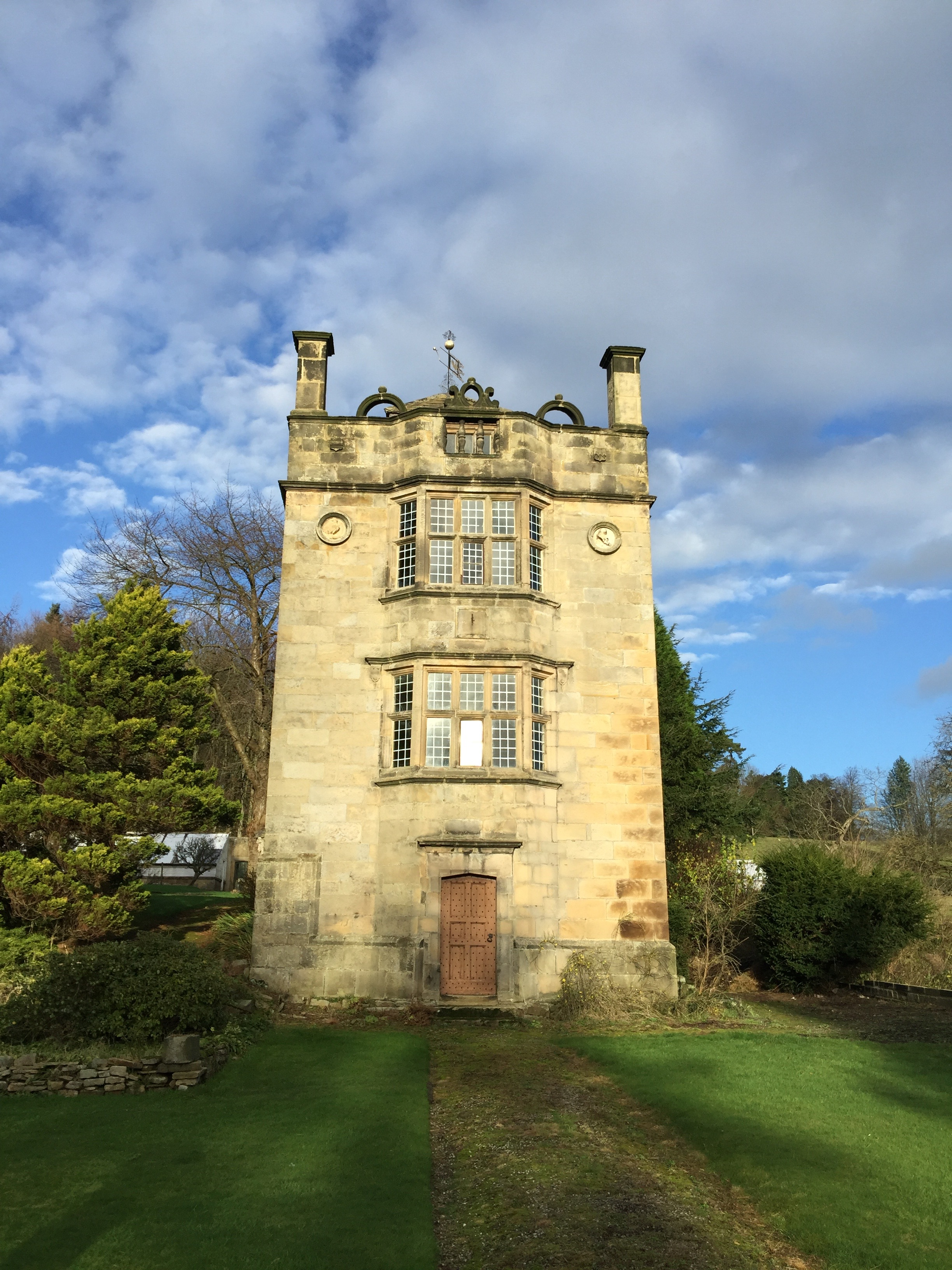
More or less a man cave, this is where the men of Weston Hall gathered to play snooker.

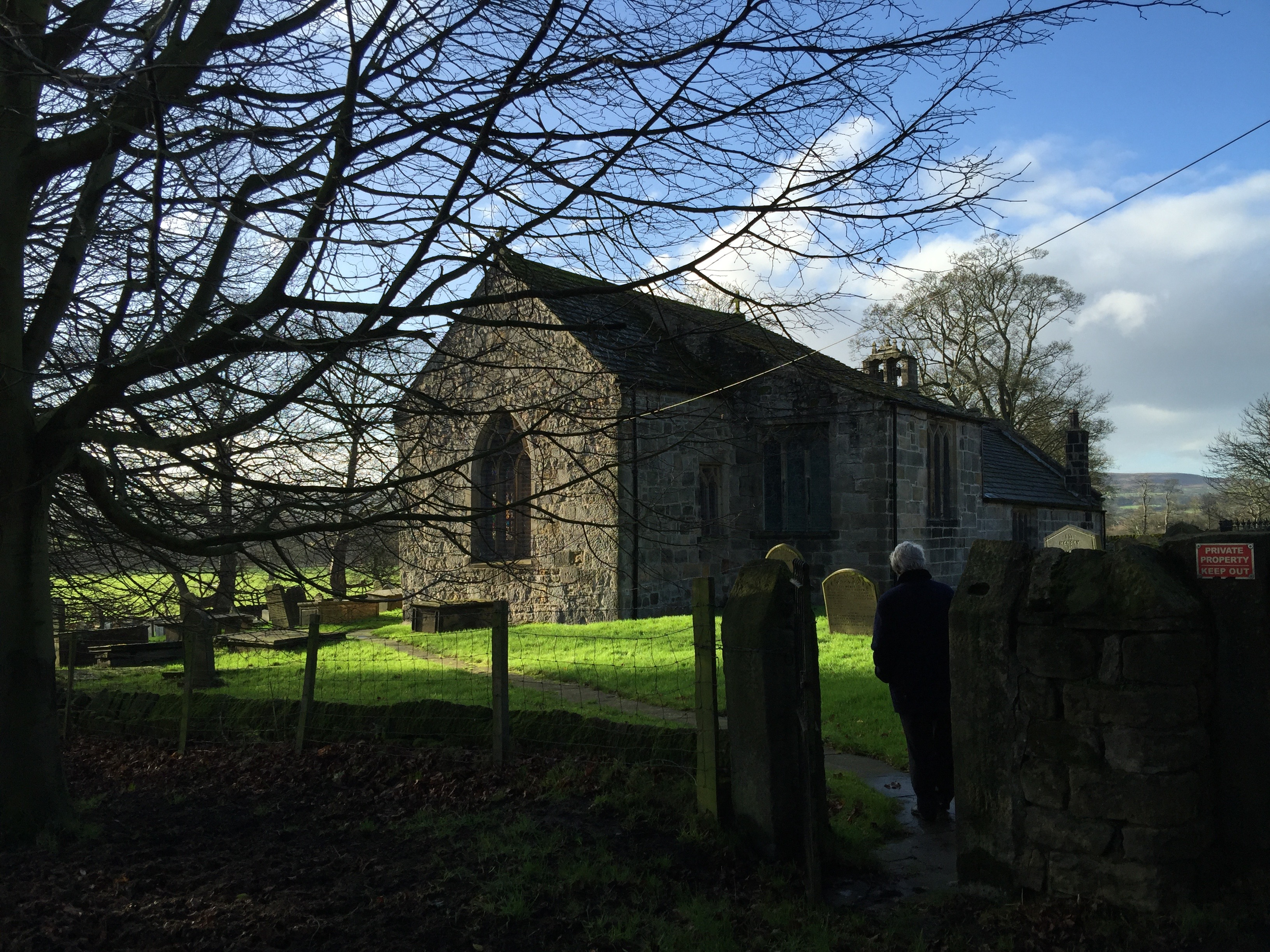
Weston Church, dating to the early 1200s, kept local records for hundreds of years.

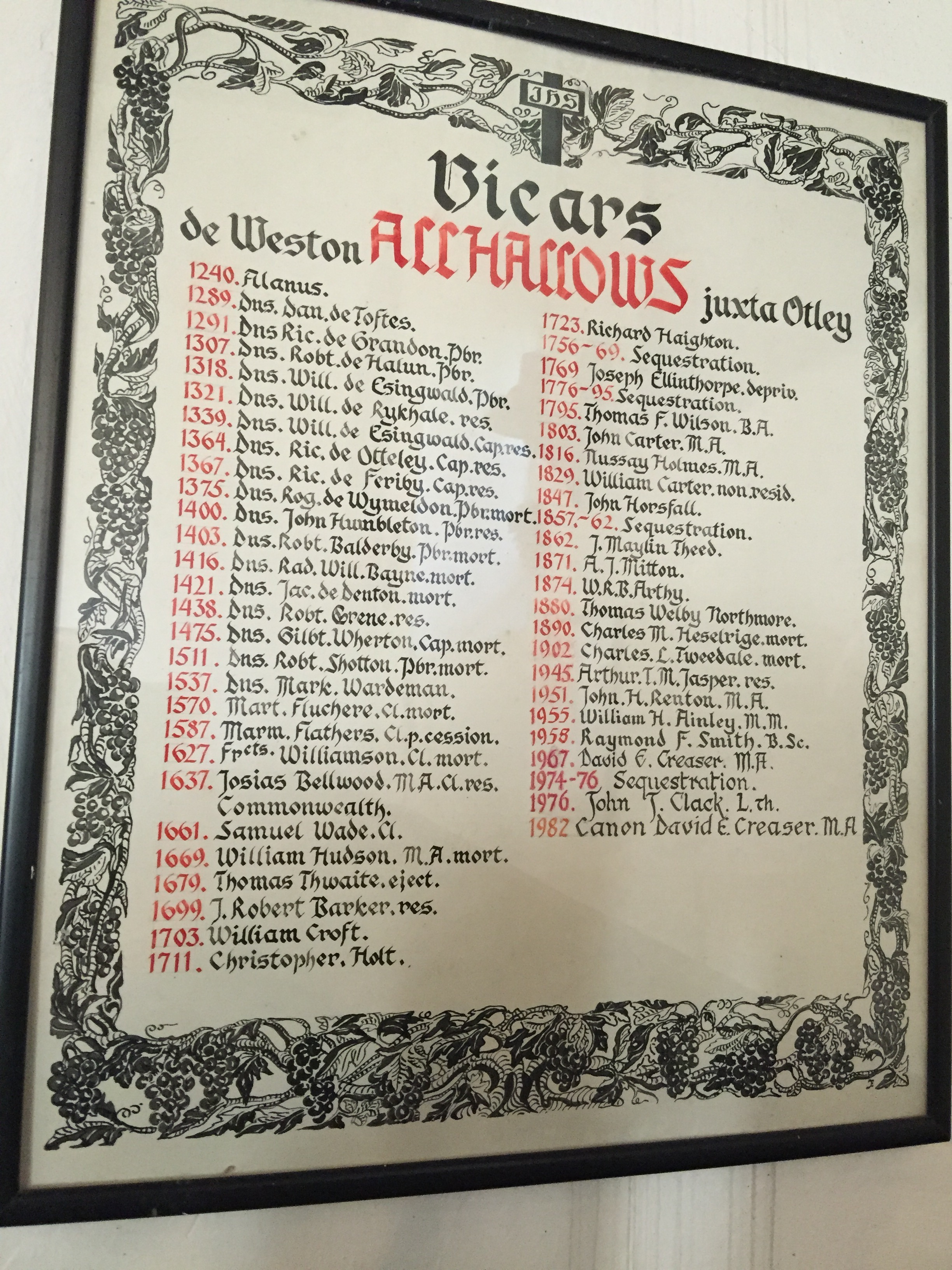
The vicars of Weston Hall dating back to 1240.

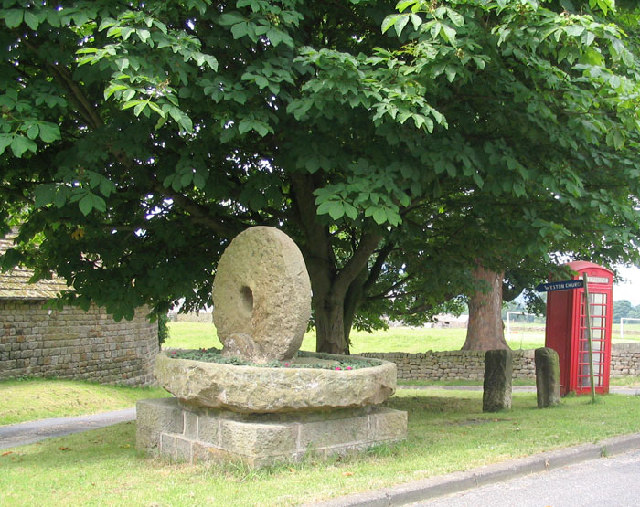
Village green.

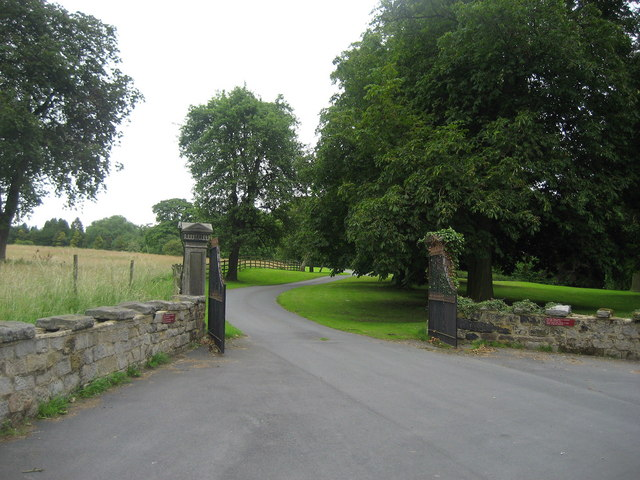
Entrance to Weston Manor, former residence of the Vavasour Family

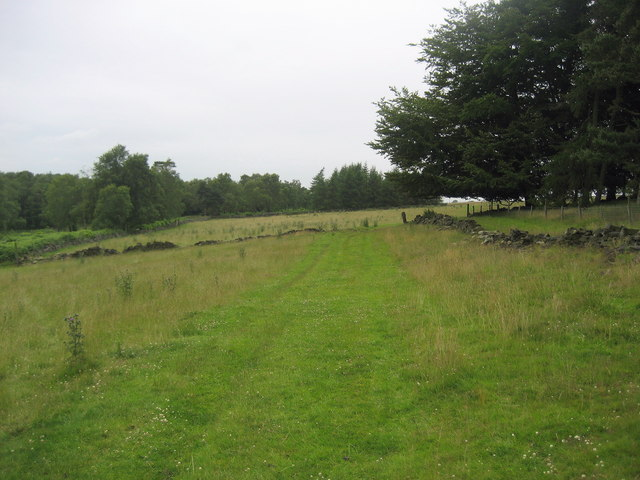
Woodland owned by the Weston Estate, including an award-winning Clay Pidgeon shooting ground.

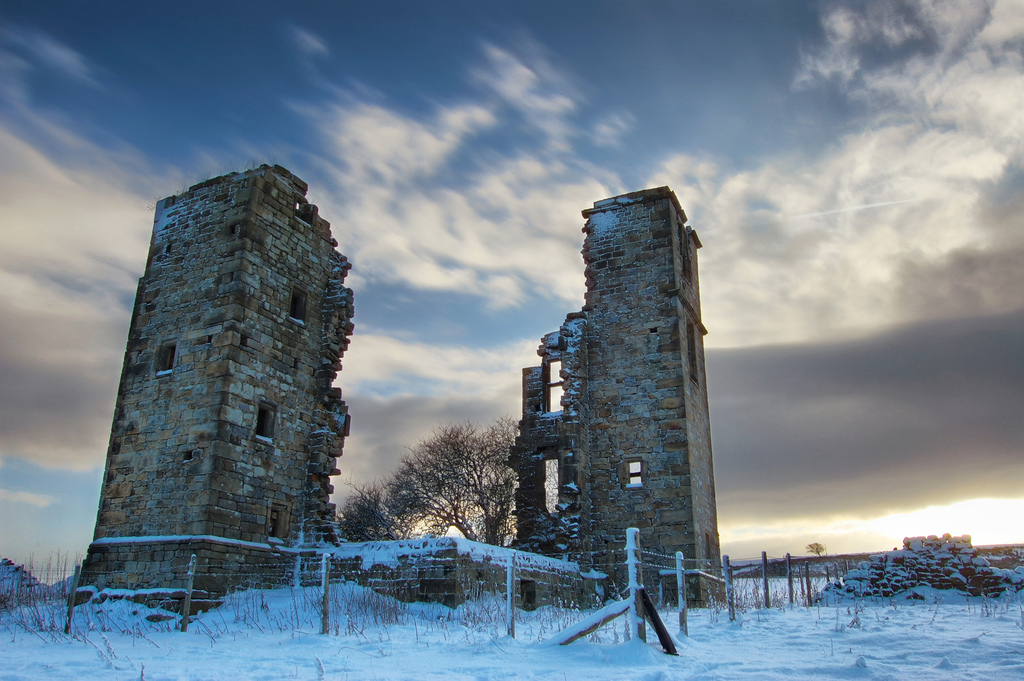
Dob Park Lodge (Remains) - 17th century hunting lodge built by the Vavasour family.
