= Empress Qinhuai =

Wife of Emperor Zhangzong of Jin

Empress Qinhuai 欽懷皇后
- Born: Hesu River, Shangjing
- Died: ca. 1186 – 1189
- Spouse: Emperor Zhangzong of Jin
Posthumous name
- Empress Qīnhuái 欽懷皇后
- Clan: Pucha (by birth); Wanyan (by marriage)
- Dynasty: Jin
- Father: Heshang
- Mother: Princess Zhengguo

Empress Qinhuai
- Traditional Chinese: 欽懷皇后
- Simplified Chinese: 钦怀皇后
Transcriptions
Standard Mandarin
- Hanyu Pinyin: Qīnhuái huánghòu

Empress Qinhuai of the Pucha clan (d. ca. 1186 – 1189, personal name unknown) was the wife of Emperor Zhangzong of Jin, the sixth emperor of the Jurchen-led Jin dynasty of China. She died before he ascended the throne and was made empress posthumously.

== Biography ==
Lady Pucha was from the aristocratic Pucha family, and many of her direct male ancestors held prominent positions in the Jin government. Lady Pucha's father also obtained various hereditary titles and military honours on marrying Princess Zhengguo, a daughter of Emperor Xizong, as befitting an imperial son-in-law.

When Lady Pucha was born, it was reported that her entire body was covered in a red light that did not fade with time. She was raised by her maternal aunt, Princess Yiguo, and when she grew older, she was known as being filial and prudent.

In 1183, Lady Pucha married Madage of the imperial Wanyan clan, the same year as his elaborate enfeoffment as Prince of Jinyuan (Chinese: 金源郡王), and she was thus given the title Lady of Jinyuan (Chinese: 金源郡王夫人). The History of Jin records that she was later given the title of imperial consort and died, but it does not record the year. She gave birth to a son named Hongyu in 1186.

== Legacy ==
When Madage ascended the throne as Emperor Zhangzong in January 1189, he gave his deceased wife the posthumous title of Empress Qinhuai. With the position of empress empty, he attempted to promote his favoured concubine Li Shi'er to the position. However, previous empresses had all come from the prominent Tudan, Tangkuo, Pucha, Nalanpusan, Hešeri, Wulinda, or Wulungu clans, so Zhangzong's decision met with fervent opposition from his ministers. As a result, Li Shi'er was promoted to Consort Yuan, one rank below empress, and Zhangzong did not instate another empress.

Early in the reign of Prince Shao of Wei, Empress Qinhuai was buried with her husband in Daoling (Chinese: 道陵).

== Family ==
- Father: Heshang (和尚), sinicised name Pucha Dingshou (蒲察鼎寿)
- Mother: Princess Zhengguo (郑国公主), daughter of Emperor Xizong
- Spouse: Emperor Zhangzong of Jin (31 August 1168 – 29 December 1208)
  - Son: Wanyan Hongyu (1186 – 25 October 1188) (完颜洪裕)
