= Yuan Dadu City Wall Ruins Park =

Urban park and historic site in Beijing

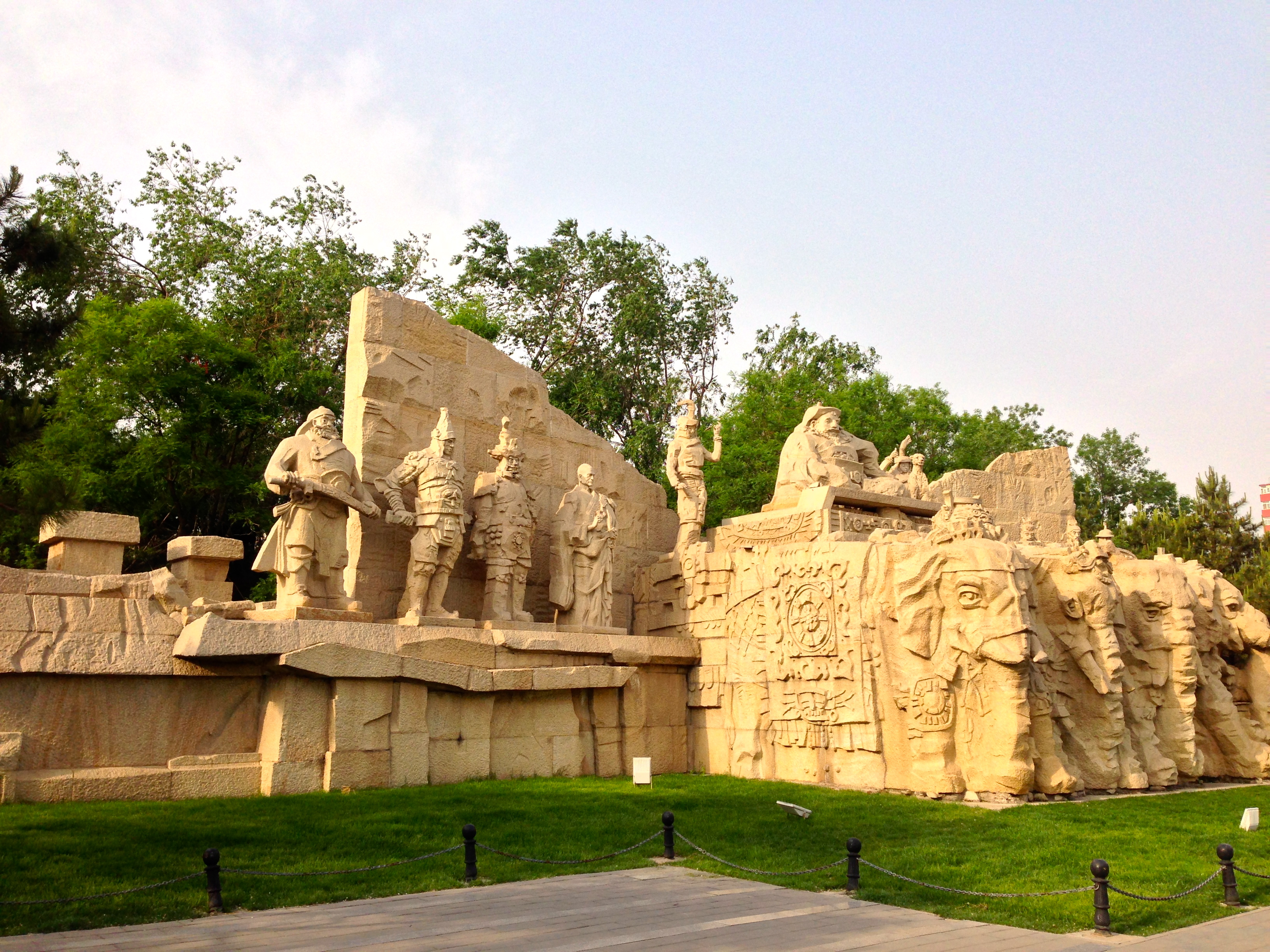
- Modern commemorative statues in the park

- Location within Beijing Location within China
- Type: Urban park, Historic site
- Location: Haidian & Chaoyang districts,Beijing, China
- Coordinates: 39°57′54″N 116°20′52″E
- Area: 8.5 km by about 150 m
- Created: 1267 (the City Wall); 1988 (the Park)
- Status: Open all year

The Yuan Dadu City Wall Ruins Park (Chinese: 元大都城垣遗址公园), also known as the Tucheng or Earth Wall Park (Chinese: 土城; pinyin: Tǔchéng; lit. 'Earthen Wall'), is an urban park and historic site in Haidian and Chaoyang districts, Beijing. The park was created in 1988 to preserve the ruins of the northern city wall of Khanbaliq (Dadu), capital of the Mongol-led Yuan dynasty. The city wall was constructed in 1267 and finished in 1276. Dadu was abandoned in the Ming dynasty, when Beijing was rebuilt and shifted to the south. The northern segment of the city wall is preserved, and a narrow and long park was created around the ruins of the city wall, located in Haidian District and Chaoyang District. It runs in between and parallel to the northern sections of the 3rd and 4th Ring Roads. The park underwent restoration in 2003.
