= Partnachplatz station =

Station of the Munich U-Bahn

Partnachplatz
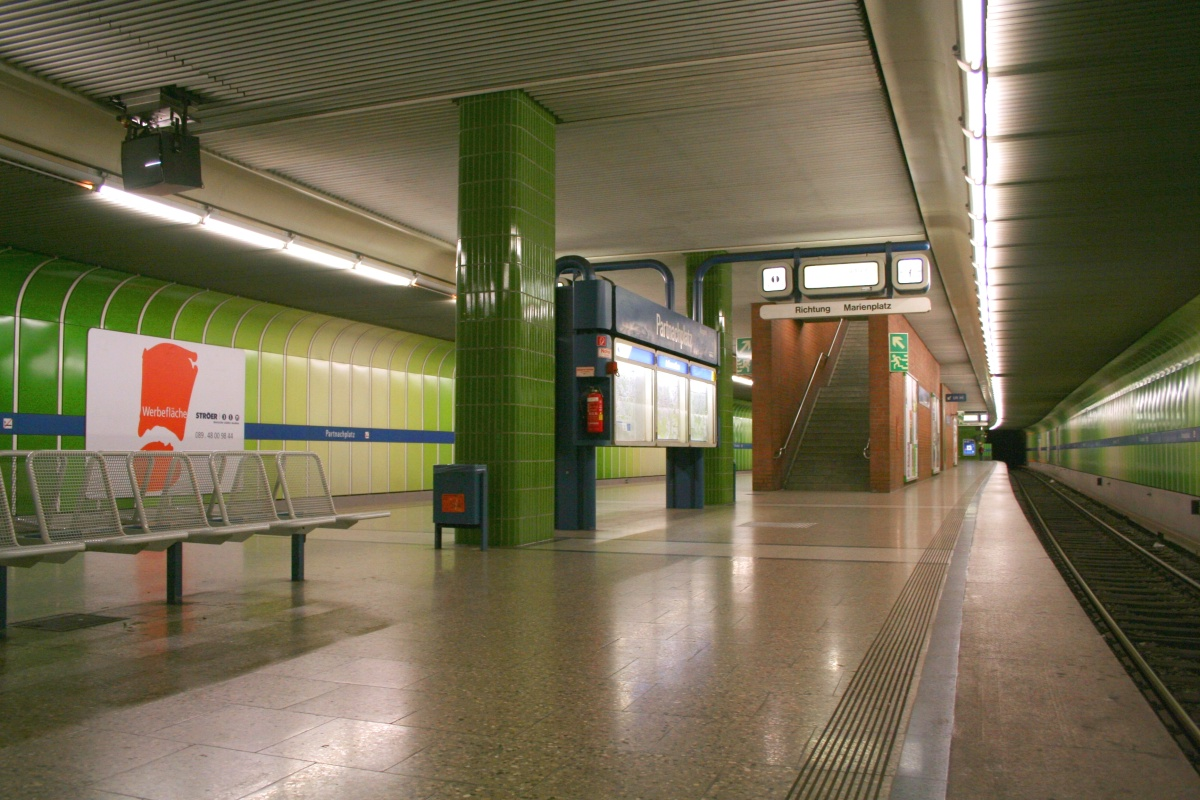

General information
- Location: Sendling-Westpark; Munich, Germany
- Coordinates: 48°07′01.10″N 11°31′35.20″E
- Platforms: Island platform
- Tracks: 2

Construction
- Structure type: Underground
- Accessible: Yes

Other information
- Fare zone: : M

Services
Preceding station	Munich U-Bahn	Following station
Westpark towards Klinikum Großhadern	U6	Harras towards Garching-Forschungszentrum
Location

Partnachplatz is an U-Bahn station in Munich on the U6.
