= Westpark station =

Station of the Munich U-Bahn

Coordinates: 48°07′05″N 11°31′00″E

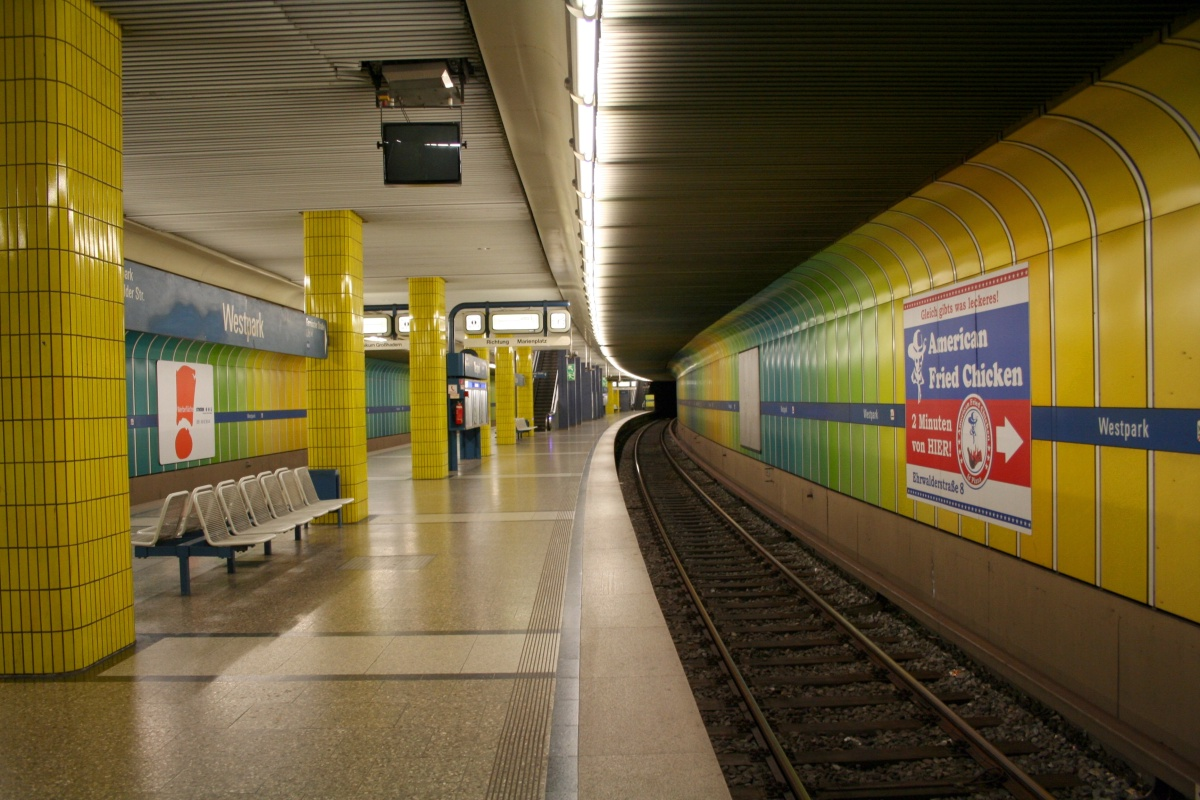
Westpark U-Bahn station

Westpark is an U-Bahn station in Munich on the U6.

Preceding station	Munich U-Bahn	Following station
Holzapfelkreuth towards Klinikum Großhadern	U6	Partnachplatz towards Garching-Forschungszentrum
