= All Saints' Church, Weston, North Yorkshire =

Church in Weston, North Yorkshire, England

Coordinates: 53°54′56″N 1°43′53″W

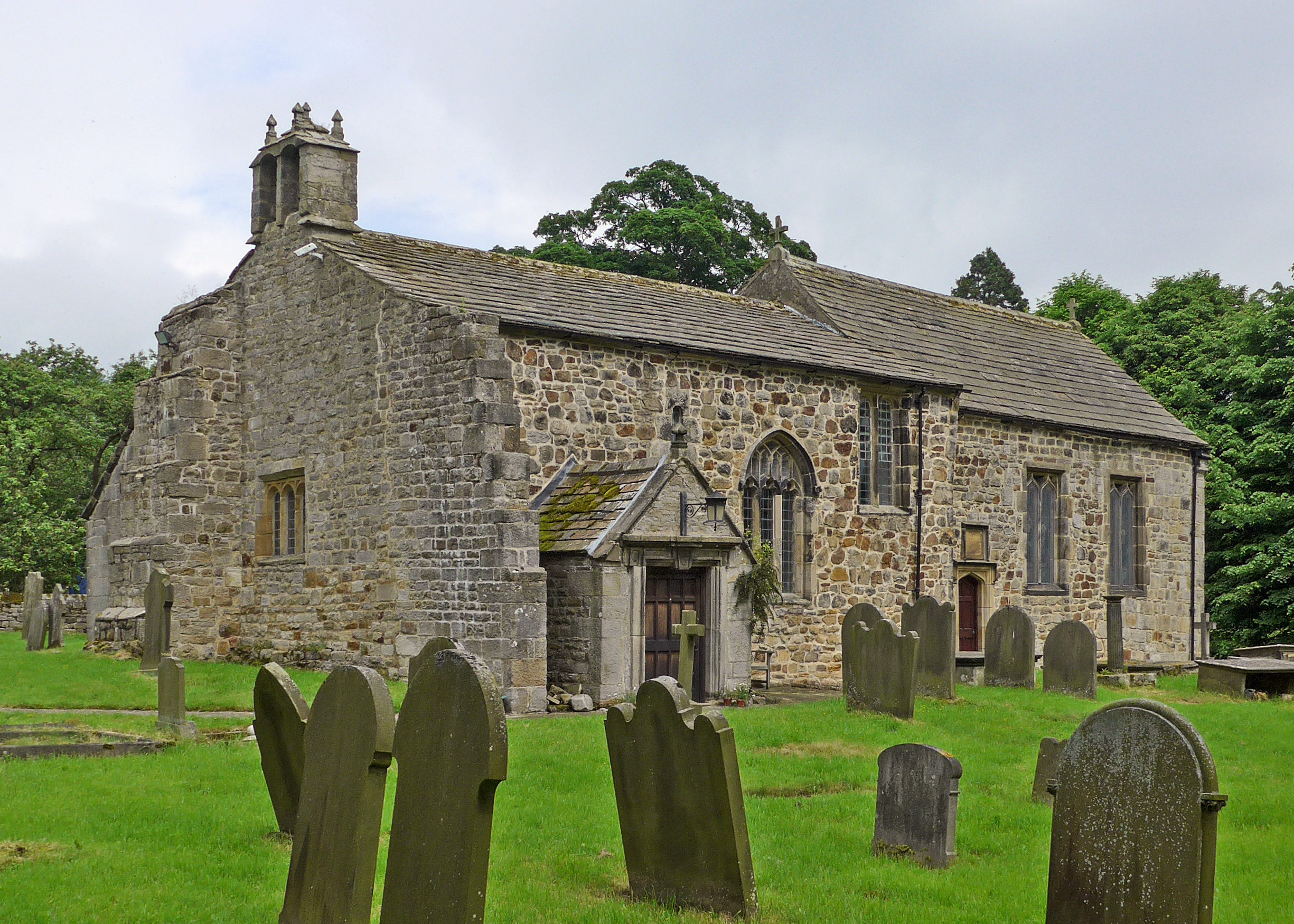
The church, in 2016

All Saints' Church is the parish church of Weston, North Yorkshire, a village in England.

A church on the site was recorded in the Domesday Book, while the current building is largely 12th century. It was extended in 1686, and then in 1819 a vestry was added, the chancel arch was altered, the roof was raised, and the church was restored. The building was grade I listed in 1966.

The church is built of gritstone with a stone slate roof, and consists of a nave with a south porch and a north aisle, and a chancel with a family pew on the north. On the west gable is a square bellcote with two arches, and at the west end are massive stepped buttresses. The south porch has a coped gable, and contains a doorway with an eared architrave, a dated keystone and a cornice, and the inner entrance has a round arch. The north wall has three carved stone fragments of an Anglo-Saxon cross. Inside is the tomb of William Stopham, who died in 1317, and of William Vavasour, who died in 1587. The three-decker pulpit, box pews and font with an octagonal stem are all 18th century.

== See also ==
- Grade I listed buildings in North Yorkshire (district)
- Listed buildings in Weston, North Yorkshire
