= Weston Hall, North Yorkshire =

Tudor and Georgian country house in Weston, North Yorkshire

Weston Hall
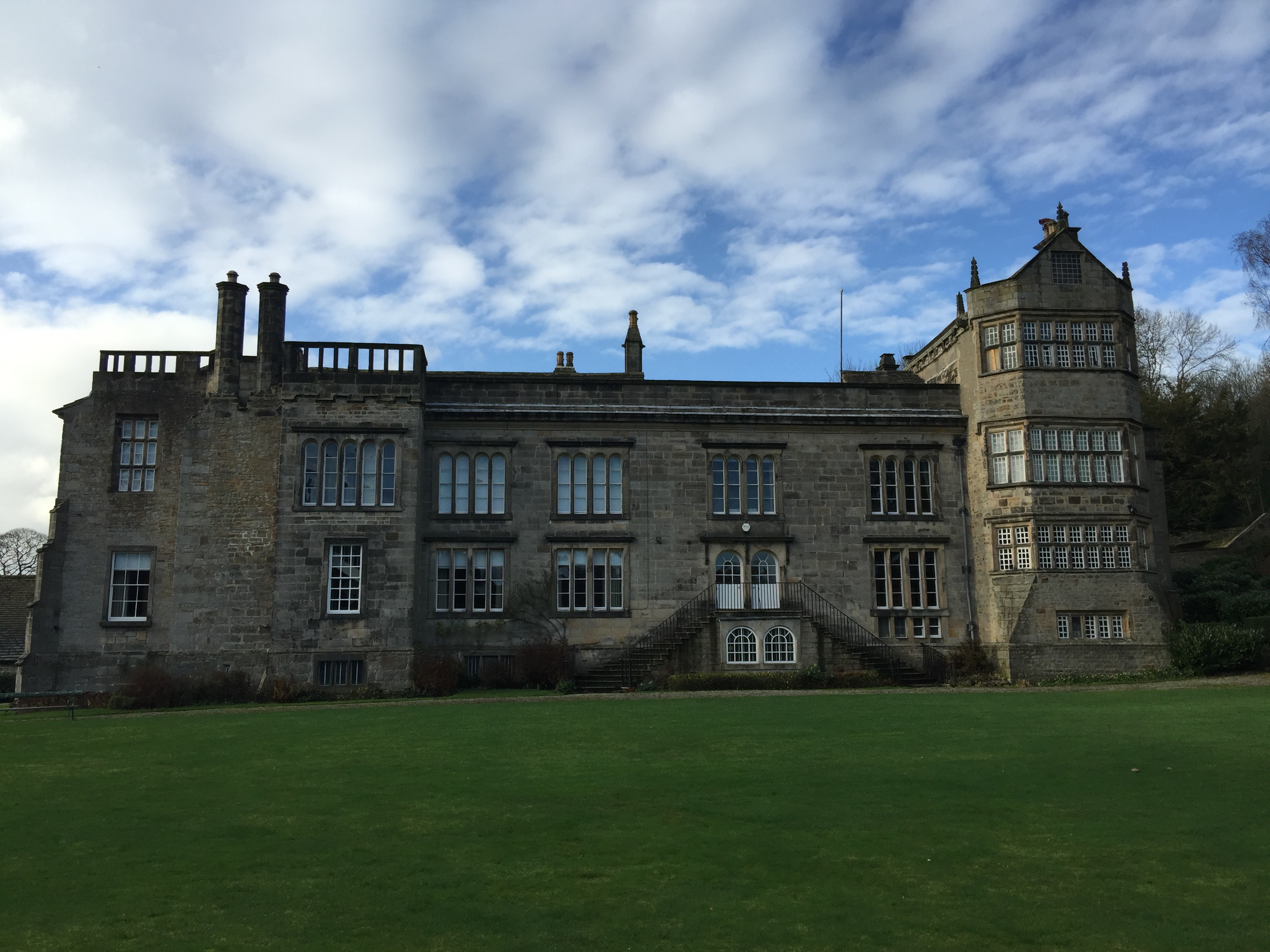
- Weston Hall East front

Additional information
Location within North Yorkshire
53°54′59″N 1°43′50″W
| Type | Country house |
| Location | Weston, North Yorkshire |
Site notes
| Architectural styles | Tudor and Georgian |
| Owner | Dawson family |
Listed Building – Grade I
| Official name | Weston Hall |
| Designated | 6 February 1952 |
| Reference no. | 1150437 |
Listed Building – Grade I
| Official name | Banqueting House Approximately 50 Metres East of Weston Hall |
| Designated | 22 November 1966 |
| Reference no. | 1150438 |

Weston Hall is a country house and Grade I listed building in Weston, North Yorkshire, England.

== History ==
The house has been in the Vavasour (Dawson after 1833) family since the 14th century. It may contain a medieval core, with a "Weston Hall" being mentioned in 1378. However, it was largely rebuilt during the reign of Elizabeth I, of which period it retains most external features.

There is also a notable Tudor or Jacobean banqueting house, called the Banqueting Hall, built for Sir Mager Vavasour, which is Grade I listed. The Hall and Banqueting Hall were formerly Grade II* listed, but were upgraded.

== Architecture ==
=== House ===
The house is built of gritstone with quoins and a roof of gritstone slabs. There is a main block of two storeys and a basement and four bays, to the south is a projecting range with two storeys and a basement, and fronts of three and four bays, and to the north is a bay with three storeys and a basement. On the garden front, the main range has a staircase of opposing stairs leading to a pair of round-arched doorways with a cornice on consoles, under which are two round-arched basement windows. The other windows are mullioned with cornices, and above is a deep eaves cornice and a blocking course. The left range contains sash windows on the ground floor, above which is a mullioned and a mullioned and transomed window, and a balustrade. The right bay contains three tiers of canted mullioned and transomed bay windows with hood moulds, above which is a blind window, a gabled parapet and tall crocketed pinnacles.

=== Banqueting House ===
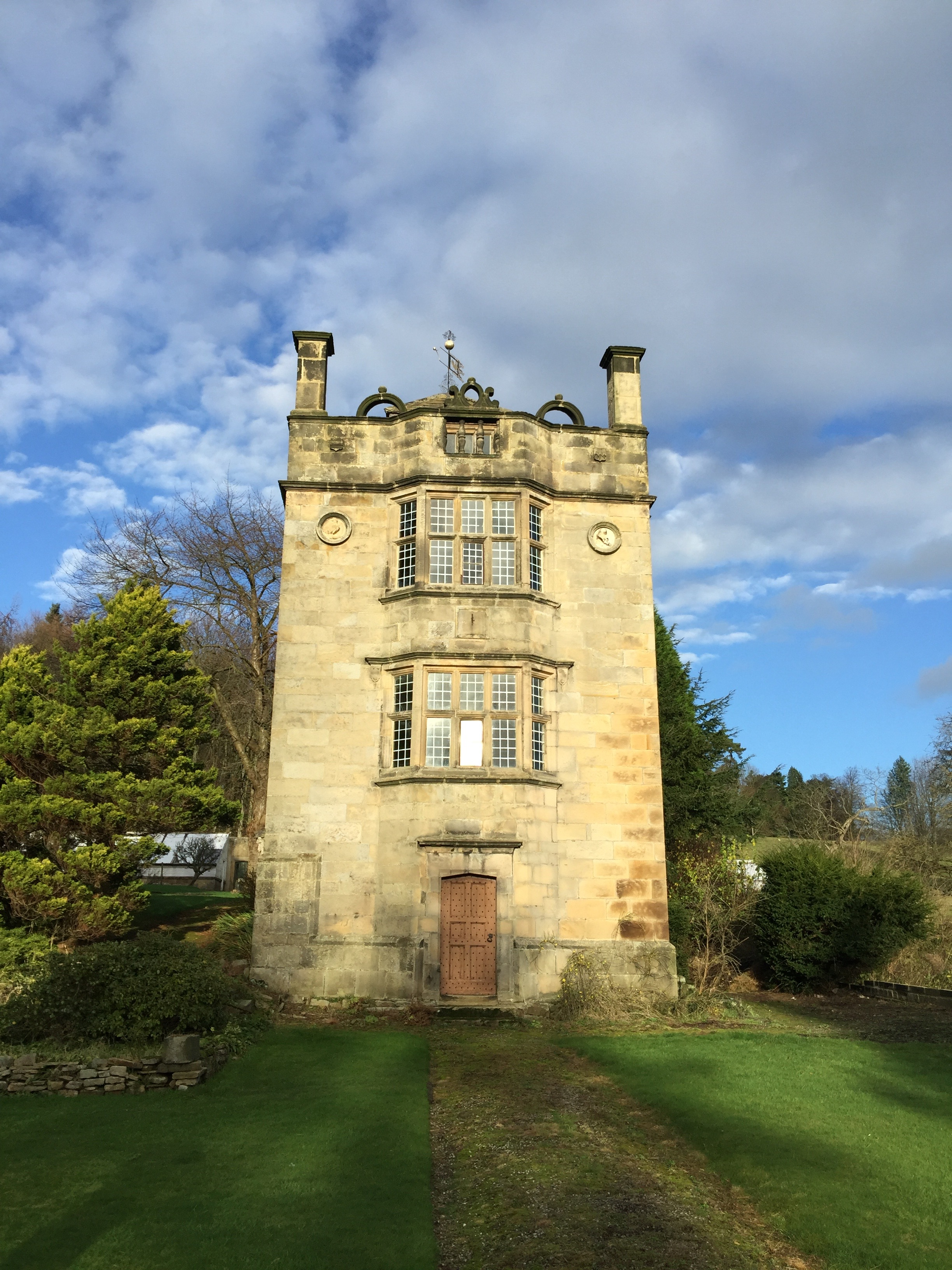
The Banqueting House

The Banqueting House is built of gritstone on a plinth, with quoins and a stone slate roof. It consists of a three-storey one-bay tower with a projecting rear stair turret surmounted by a gazebo. On the south front is a doorway with a triangular head and a cornice. The upper floors each contains a five-light mullioned and transomed bay window with cornices, the upper windows flanked by roundels. On the left return external steps lead to a doorway on the stair turret, to the right are two recesses containing gadrooned urns, and above are mullioned and transomed windows. All the windows are recessed and have moulded surrounds.

=== Barn ===
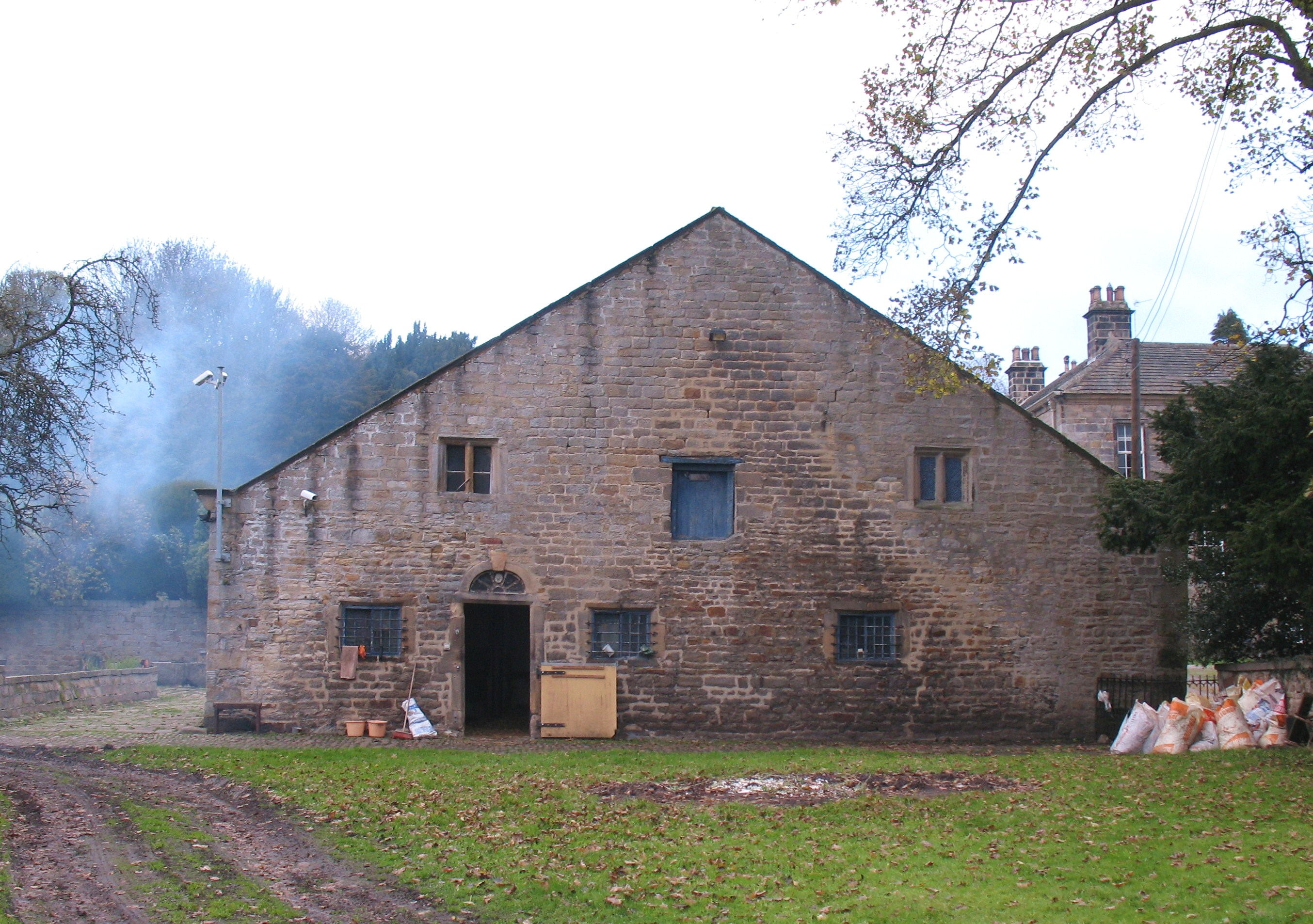
The barn

South of the hall is a grade II* listed barn, built in or before the 16th century. It has a timber framed core, it was encased in gritstone in the 17th century, and later converted into stables and a coach house. It has quoins and a stone slate roof with shaped kneelers and gable copings, and there are five bays and double aisles. The openings include doorways, windows, some with mullions, a pitching door and vents.

== In film ==
The Weston Hall was featured in the 1970 film Wuthering Heights, with the hall being used for Lintons' manor.

== See also ==
- Grade I listed buildings in North Yorkshire (district)
- Listed buildings in Weston, North Yorkshire
