= Xiyuan station =

Xiyuan station may refer to:

- Xi Yuan station, a station on Line 4 and Line 16 of the Beijing Subway
- Xiyuan station (Kunming Metro), a station on Line 3 of Kunming Metro
