= Westpark Elementary School =

Westpark Elementary School may refer to:

- Westpark Elementary School, administered by the Lester B. Pearson School Board in Dollard-des-Ormeaux, Quebec, Canada
- Westpark Elementary School, in the Irvine Unified School District in Irvine, California, US
