= Taiye Lake =

Artificial lake in Beijing in ancient China

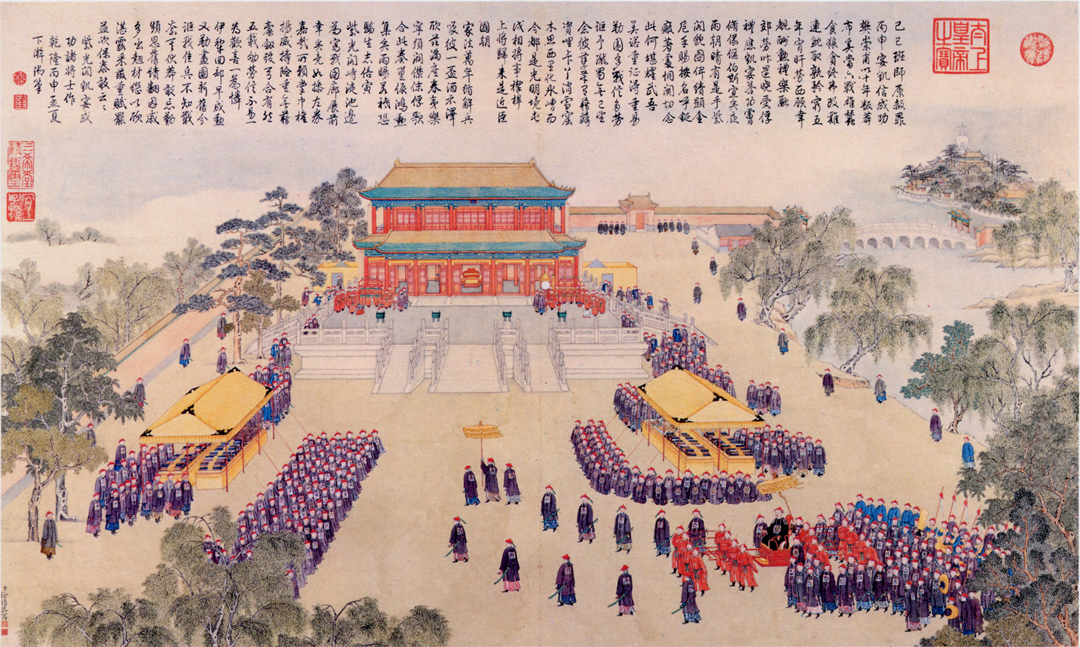
- Zhongnanhai during the Qing dynasty
- Chinese: 太液池
- Literal meaning: Great Liquid Pond
Transcriptions
Standard Mandarin
- Hanyu Pinyin: Tàiyè Chí
- Wade–Giles: T'ai-yeh Ch'ih

Taiye Lake or Taiye Pond was an artificial lake in imperial City, Beijing, during the Jin, Yuan, Ming, and Qing dynasties of China. The beauty and utility of the lake was responsible for the siting of Kublai Khan's palace and the position of modern Beijing. It continues to exist but it is now known separately as the North, Central, and South Seas, the three interconnected lakes just west of the Forbidden City in downtown Beijing. The northern lake makes up the public Beihai Park while the southern two are grouped together as Zhongnanhai, the headquarters for the Communist leadership of the People's Republic of China.

Taiye Lake was immortalized in the early 1410s when the Yongle Emperor commissioned The Eight Views of Beijing (北京八景圖), recording the capital's chief sites in poetry and painting in order to legitimize his removal of the imperial capital away from Nanking. It is best remembered in China today from the scene of "Clear Waves at Taiye Lake" (太液晴波, Tàiyè Qíngbō).

== Name ==
The literal meaning of the Chinese characters 太液池 is "Great Liquid Pool" or "Great Liquid Pond".

Before the Taiye Lake watershed system in Beijing that still exists today known as North, Central and South Seas, the name "Taiye" had honored several lakes in imperial gardens or palaces in various locations that once served as capital cities of imperial China. An early example of Taiye Lake is located in the city of Xi'an. Two lakes named Taiye existed in Xi'an (known as Chang'an). The earlier Taiye Lake was excavated in the Han dynasty by the Emperor Wu in the 1st century BC as part of his Jianzhang Palace (建章宮, Jiànzhānggōng). This lake, along with the Kunming Lake, was a necessary addition to the city's water supply after the expansion of the capital city under Emperor Wu's reign.

The second Taiye Lake in Xi'an was excavated in the Tang dynasty by the Emperor Taizong next to his father's Daming Palace, after the capital had been relocated several miles northward due to the growing salinity of the water source at the original site.

There are older Taiye Lakes in Beijing, too. In 1151, Beijing (known as Zhongdu) became the capital city of the Jurchen-led Jin dynasty. The emperor Wanyan Liang ordered to rebuild Beijing in style of Kaifeng, the former capital city of Song dynasty in the south. During the reconstruction of Beijing, a Taiye Lake was built near the palace of Jurchens. The relic of this Taiye Lake is in today's Xicheng district outside of the southwestern second ring road and roughly near the Guang'an Gate of Beijing in later dynasties.

The still-existing Taiye Lakes in Beijing were first created in the Mongol-led Yuan dynasty when Beijing was reconstructed as Khanbaliq (Dadu) after the previous Beijing city had been seriously damaged during the Mongol conquest of the Jin dynasty.

== History ==
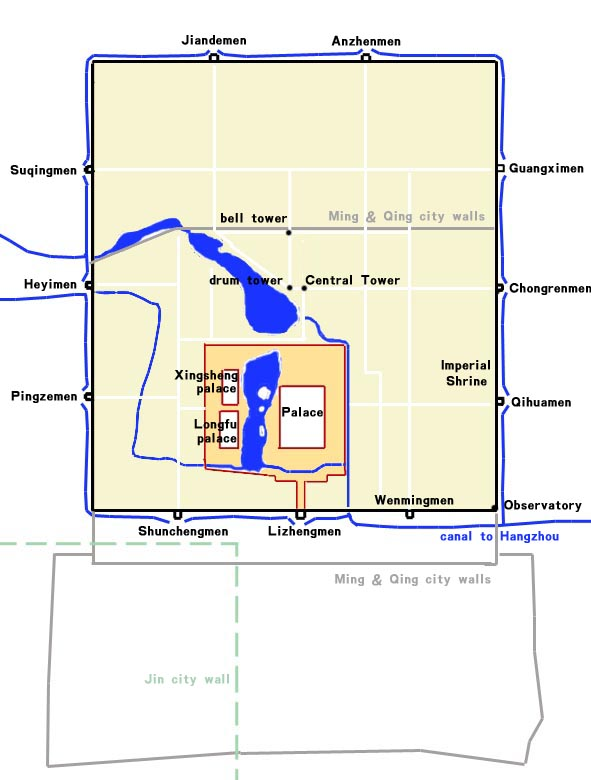
A map of Khanbaliq showing the gardens and three palaces around Taiye Lake, as well as the original three islands. The city walls of Zhongdu and Beijing are also noted.

The lake was first constructed as part of the Jinshui River (Note: The name paid tribute both to the new dynasty and to an earlier imperial canal in the Song capital Dongjing (modern Kaifeng). Its literal meaning is "Gold Water".) canal system under the Emperor Zhangzong of Jin. Although still within the limits of modern Beijing, the Jin capital of Zhongdu was located well south of the site, in a separate watershed. Zhangzong constructed the Daning Palace (t 大寧宮, s 大宁宫, Dànínggōng, lit. "Palace of Great Peace" (Note: Other names include the Taining (t 太寧宮, s太宁宫), the Shou'an, and the Wanning (t 萬寧宮, s万宁宫) Palace.)) beside the new lake in 1179.

During the Yuan dynasty, the ruined site of Zhongdu and its more meager water sources were abandoned in favor of the Gaoliang watershed. The imperial engineers Liu Bingzhong and Guo Shoujing directed the construction of the new Imperial City of Khanbaliq (Marco Polo's Cambaluc & the Chinese Dadu) around Zhangzong's former palace and Lake Taiye, which was an important part of the capital's water supply. The lake was expanded until it covered the area of the present northern and central "seas" and three palaces were built around it. The purity of the reservoir was protected by law: from its source at a spring on Yuquan Mountain to Lake Taiye, the Jinshui was given separate passes where it crossed other streams and commoners were forbidden to bathe, wash clothes, water livestock, or dump trash along its course.

Under the Ming dynasty, construction on the present-day Forbidden City began in AD 1406 as part of the Yongle Emperor's relocation of the capital away from Nanjing. The new palace was south of the former Yuan one and the Taiye was expanded south along with it. The soil excavated from the lake and the fortress's moat were piled up to the palace's north to form the Mountain of Long Life (now known as Jingshan), burying the former Yuan site and improving the fengshui of the new one. The lake now comprised the three present-day "seas", which were divided by bridges, but continued to be known collectively as Taiye. The grounds were known as the Xiyuan or Western Garden (西苑, Xīyuàn) and the Jiajing Emperor and others retreated to it to escape life at court.

After the establishment of the Manchu-led Qing dynasty in the 17th century, the new government reduced the extensive Ming-era parks around the lake, enclosed the smaller present-day area within walls attached to the imperial palace, and began calling the separate sections by their modern names. Successive emperors built pavilions and houses along the lake shore, where they held court during the summer.

== See also ==
- Beihai Park
- Zhongnanhai
- History of Beijing
- Chinese gardening
