= Dongjin, Hubei =

Dongjin 东津镇
- Town
- Location in Hubei
- Coordinates: 32°01′34″N 112°13′58″E
- Country: People's Republic of China
- Province: Hubei
- Prefecture-level city: Xiangyang
- District: Xiangzhou
- Village-level divisions: 1 residential community 53 villages
- Elevation: 69 m (226 ft)

Population (2010)
  - Total: 95,788
- Time zone: UTC+8 (China Standard)
- Area code: 0710

Dongjin (simplified Chinese: 东津; traditional Chinese: 東津; pinyin: Dōngjīn; lit. 'east ford') is a town of Xiangzhou District, Xiangyang, Hubei, People's Republic of China, located in the eastern suburbs of the city and on the eastern (left) bank of the Han River. As of 2011, it has one residential community (居委会) and 53 villages under its administration.

== Administrative divisions ==
Villages:

- Shangying (上营村), Qixiang (祁巷村), Dongjin (东津村), Fanying (樊营村), Fanpo (樊坡村), Chenpo (陈坡村), Yishe (一社村), Ershe (二社村), Shangzhou (上洲村), Zhongzhou (中洲村), Xiazhou (下洲村), Wangzhai (王寨村), Sanhe (三合村), Liwan (李湾村), Qiangang (前岗村), Hougang (后岗村), Weili (魏李村), Zhuangchong (庄冲村), Chunhe (淳河村), Tangchong (唐冲村), Qinzui (秦咀村), Tianchong (田冲村), Pengzhuang (彭庄村), Yanpo (堰坡村), Zhouzhai (周寨村), Zhupeng (朱彭村), Tanwan (覃湾村), Cuihu (崔胡村), Xiaogang (肖岗村), Yuegang (岳岗村), Tangdian (唐店村), Sunwangying (孙王营村), Liudian (刘店村), Houying (侯营村), Shenying (沈营村), Zhonglou (中楼村), Yingkou (营口村), Fuzhai (付寨村), Wuwan (吴湾村), Heli (合力村), Lüzhai (吕寨村), Xiaoying (肖营村), Tangzhuang (唐庄村), Yuedi (岳底村), Magang (马岗村), Liugou (柳沟村), Zhengwan (郑湾村), Dahuo (打伙村), Qili (七里村), Zhangzui (张咀村), Zhuying (朱营村), Jianpo (简坡村)

== See also ==
- List of township-level divisions of Hubei
