= Xiangzhou, Xiangyang =

Xiangzhou 襄州区
- District
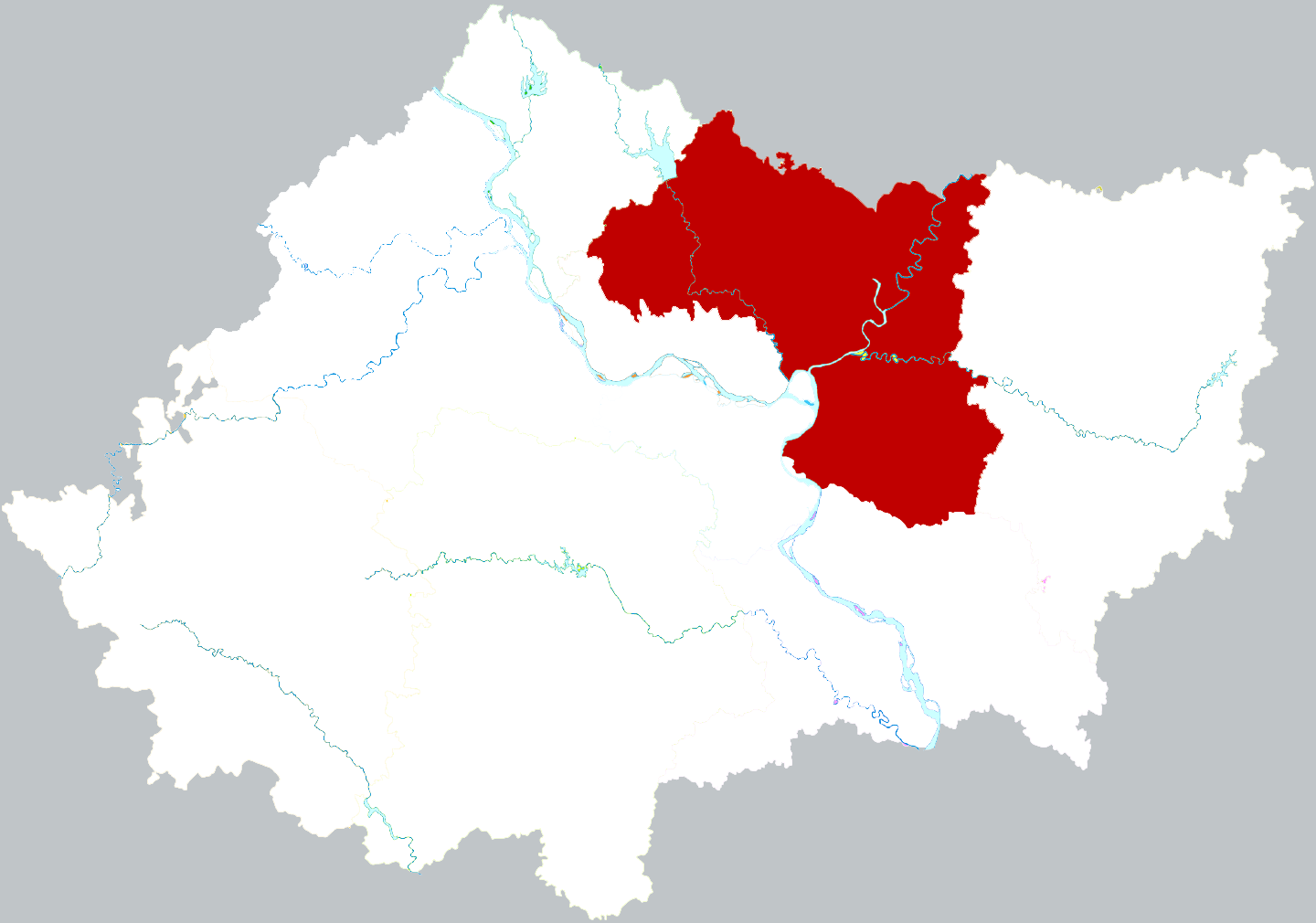
- Location in Xiangyang

- Location in Hubei
- Coordinates: 32°05′14″N 112°12′43″E
- Country: People's Republic of China
- Province: Hubei
- Prefecture-level city: Xiangyang

Area
  - Total: 2,306 km^{2} (890 sq mi)

Population (2020)
  - Total: 923,235
  - Density: 400.4/km^{2} (1,037/sq mi)
- Time zone: UTC+8 (China Standard)
- Website: hbxy.gov.cn

Xiangzhou
- Chinese: 襄州
Transcriptions
Standard Mandarin
- Hanyu Pinyin: Xiāngzhōu
- Wade–Giles: Hsiang^{1}-chou^{1}

Xiangyang (the former city)
- Traditional Chinese: 襄陽
- Simplified Chinese: 襄阳
- Postal: Siangyang
Transcriptions
Standard Mandarin
- Hanyu Pinyin: Xiāngyáng
- Wade–Giles: Hsiang^{1}-yang^{2}

Xiangzhou District (simplified Chinese: 襄州区; traditional Chinese: 襄州區; pinyin: Xiāngzhōu Qū) is a district of the city of Xiangyang, Hubei, People's Republic of China. The district itself was formerly known as Xiangyang (襄阳区). It was a city famous for the siege of Xiangyang (1267–1273) by invading forces of the Mongol-founded Yuan Dynasty. It was also an important city during the period of the Three Kingdoms, in the Romance of the Three Kingdoms it was said that it was nearby Xiangyang that Zhuge Liang received his three visits from Liu Bei. Xiangyang was also where Sun Jian fought Liu Biao in 191 AD during the Three Kingdoms. Today, Xiangzhou has been incorporated with nearby Fancheng to form the prefecture-level city of Xiangyang, part of Hubei province.

== Administrative divisions ==
Subdistricts:

- Zhangwan Subdistrict (张湾街道), Liuji Subdistrict (刘集街道), Xiaowan Subdistrict (肖湾街道), Liulianghe Subdistrict (六两河街道)

Towns:

- Longwang (龙王镇), Shiqiao (石桥镇), Huangji (黄集镇), Huopai (伙牌镇), Guyi (古驿镇), Zhuji (朱集镇), Chenghe (程河镇), Shuanggou (双沟镇), Zhangjiaji (张家集镇), Huanglong (黄龙镇), Yushan (峪山镇), Dongjin (东津镇), Mizhuang (米庄镇)

== Transportation ==
Xiangyang East railway station is located in the district and is an interchange between multiple high-speed lines.

== See also ==
- Zhang Ji (poet from Hubei)
