= List of Song dynasty princes consort =

The following lists contain the princes consort recorded in the imperial genealogy and chronicles.

== Daughters of the emperors of the Song dynasty ==
=== Daughters of Emperor Xuanzu ===
Year	Prince consort	Princess	Mother	Issue	References
960	Gao Huaide (高怀德)	Princess Gongyi (恭懿帝姬)	Empress Dowager Du	1.Princess Renshou (仁寿公主)	

=== Daughters of Emperor Taizu ===
Year	Prince consort	Princess	Mother	References
970	Wang Chengyan	Princess Xiansu (贤肃帝姬)	Empress Xiaohui	
972	Shi Baoji	Princess Xianjing (贤靖帝姬)	Empress Xiaohui	
972	Wei Xianxin	Princess Xianhui (贤惠帝姬)	NN	

=== Daughters of emperor Taizong ===
Year	Prince consort	Princess	Mother	Issue	References
984	Wu Yuanyi (吴元庡)	Princess Yinghui (英惠帝姬)	NN		
1002	Chai Zongqing (柴宗庆)	Princess Hejing (和靖帝姬)	Noble consort, of the Zang clan		
1003	Wang Yiyong (王贻永)	Princess Yishun (懿顺帝姬)	NN		
1008	Li Zunxu (李尊勖)	Princess Xianmu (献穆帝姬)	Noble consort, of the Fang clan		

=== Daughters of Emperor Renzong of Song ===
Year	Prince Consort	Princess	Mother	Issue	References
NN	Li Wei (李玮)	Princess Zhuangxiao (庄孝帝姬)	Noble Consort Zhaojie, of the Miao clan		
1067	Qian Jingzhen (钱景臻)	Princess Lingde (令德帝姬)	Noble Consort Zhaoshu, of the Zhou clan	Sons: 1. Qian Chen; 2. Qian E; Daughters: 1. Princess of the Yichun commandery 2. Princess of the Xindu commandery 3. Princess of the Tong'an commandery 4. Princess of the Qi'an commandery 5. Princess of the Jian'an commandery 6. Princess of the Wen'an commandery	
1076	Cao Shi (曹诗)	Princess Xianyi (贤懿帝姬)	Consort Shu, of the Dong clan		
1082	Guo Xianqing (郭献卿)	Princess Yimu (懿穆帝姬)	Noble Consort Zhaoshu, of the Zhou clan		

=== Daughters of Emperor Yingzong of Song ===
Year	Prince consort	Princess	Mother	Issue	References
1066	Wang Shiyue (王师约)	Princess Huihe (惠和帝姬)	NN		
1063	Wang Shen (王诜)	Princess Xianhui (贤惠帝姬)	Empress Xuanren	1 son	
1068	Zhang Dunli (张敦礼)	Princess Xiande (贤德帝姬)	Empress Xuanren	1 son and 1 daughter	
NN	Xu Jue (许珏)	Princess De'an (德安帝姬)	NN	2 sons: 1. Xu Zhongli (许仲礼); 2. Xu Zhongjin (许仲进)	

=== Daughters of Emperor Shenzong of Song ===
Year	Prince consort	Princess	Mother	Issue	References
NN	Han Jiayan (韩嘉彦)	Princess Xianmu (贤穆帝姬)	NN		
1097	Wang Yu (王遇)	Princess Xianxiao (贤孝帝姬)	Noble Consort, of the Song clan		
1104	Pan Yi (潘意)	Princess Xianjing (贤静帝姬)	Empress Qincheng	2 sons, including Pan Mou (潘某)	

=== Daughters of Emperor Zhezong ===
Year	Prince consort	Princess	Mother	Issue	References
1110	Shi Duanli (石端礼）	Princess Jingyi (靖懿帝姬)	NN		
1112	Pan Zhengfu (潘正夫)	Princess Kangyi (康懿帝姬)	Empress Zhaohuai	Sons: 1. Pan Changqing (潘长卿); 2. Pan Cuiqing (潘粹卿); 3. Pan Duanqing (潘端卿)	

=== Daughters of Emperor Huizong of Song ===
Year	Prince consort	Princess	Mother	Issue	References
1115	Ceng Yin (曾夤)	Zhao Yupan, Princess Jiade (嘉德帝姬赵玉盘)	Empress Xiansu	2 daughters	
1127	Wanyan Zongpan (完颜宗磐)	Zhao Yupan, Princess Jiade (嘉德帝姬赵玉盘)	Empress Xiansu		
1139	Wanyan Dan	Zhao Yupan, Princess Jiade (嘉德帝姬赵玉盘)	Empress Xiansu		
1115	Cao Cheng (曹晟)	Zhao Jinnu, Princess Rongde (荣德帝姬赵金奴)	Empress Xiangong		
1127	Wanyan Chang (完颜昌)	Zhao Jinnu, Princess Rongde (荣德帝姬赵金奴)	Empress Xiangong		
1139	Wanyan Dan	Zhao Jinnu, Princess Rongde (荣德帝姬赵金奴)	Empress Xiangong		
1127	Song Bangguang (宋邦光)	Zhao Jinluo, Princess Ande (安德帝姬赵金罗)	Empress Xiansu	1 daughter	
1127	Wanyan Dumu (完颜阇母)	Zhao Jinluo, Princess Ande (安德帝姬赵金罗)	Empress Xiansu		
1118	Cai Tiao (蔡条)	Zhao Fujin, Princess Maode (茂德帝姬赵福金)	Empress Mingda	Son: Cai Yu (蔡愉)	
1127	Wanyan Zongwang (完颜宗望)	Zhao Fujin, Princess Maode (茂德帝姬赵福金)	Empress Mingda		
1127	Wanyan Xiyin (完颜希尹)	Zhao Fujin, Princess Maode (茂德帝姬赵福金)	Empress Mingda		
NN	Xiang Zifang (向子房)	Zhao Hu'er, Princess Chengde (成德帝姬赵瑚儿)	Empress Xiansu		
NN	Tian Pi (田丕)	Zhao Fujin, Princess Xunde (洵德帝姬赵富金)	Empress Mingda		
1127	Wanyan Sheyema (完颜设也马)	Zhao Fujin, Princess Xunde (洵德帝姬赵富金)	Empress Mingda		
NN	Liu Wenyan (刘文彦)	Zhao Qiaoyun, Princess Xiande (显德帝姬赵巧云)	Talented Lady, of the Qiao clan		
NN	Xiang Ziyi (向子扆)	Zhao Yingluo, Princess Shunde (顺德帝姬赵缨络)	NN		
1127	Wanyan Zonghan	Zhao Yingluo, Princess Shunde (顺德帝姬赵缨络)	NN		
1137	Wanyan Shengunai (完颜什古乃)	Zhao Yingluo, Princess Shunde (顺德帝姬赵缨络)	NN		
1119	Cao Shi (曹湜）	Princess Chongde (崇德帝姬)	Noble Consort, of the Wang clan		
NN	Wuzhu	Zhao Yuanzhu, Princess Yifu (仪福帝姬赵圆珠)	NN		
1127	Wanyan Zongwang (完颜宗望)	Zhao Huanhuan, Princess Roufu (柔福帝姬)	Noble Consort Yisu		
1127	Wanyan Zongxian (完颜宗贤)	Zhao Huanhuan, Princess Roufu (柔福帝姬)	Noble Consort Yisu		
1127	Emperor Taizong of Jin	Zhao Huanhuan, Princess Roufu (柔福帝姬)	Noble Consort Yisu		
NN	Xu Hai (徐还)	Zhao Huanhuan, Princess Roufu (柔福帝姬)	Noble Consort Yisu		
1127	Wanyan Xiebao (完颜斜保)	Zhao Zhuzhu, Princess Huifu (惠福帝姬赵珠珠)	Wanrong, of the Wang clan	1 son	
1127	Wanyan Zongjuan (完颜宗隽)	Zhao Chuanzhu, Princess Ningfu (宁福帝姬)	Noble Consort, of the Cui clan	Son: Wanyan Mou	
1139	Wanyan Dan	Zhao Chuanzhu, Princess Ningfu (宁福帝姬)	Noble Consort, of the Cui clan		
NN	Wanyan Dan	Zhao Jinyin, Princess Lingfu (令福帝姬赵金印)	NN		
NN	Wanyan Dan	Zhao Saiyue, Princess Huafu (华福帝姬赵赛月)	NN		
1135	Wanyan Dan	Zhao Jingu, Princess Qingfu (庆福帝姬赵金姑)	NN		
NN	Wanyan Sheyema (完颜设也马)	Zhao Jinling, Princess Chunfu (纯福帝姬赵金铃)	NN		
NN	Wang Chengdi (王成棣）	Zhao Jinling, Princess Chunfu (纯福帝姬赵金铃)	NN		
NN	Li Dunfu (李敦复)	Princess Quanfu (全福帝姬)	Jieyu, of the Wang clan		

=== Daughters of Emperor Ningzong ===
Year	Prince Consort	Princess	Mother	References
NN	Lin Cun (林存)	Princess Yuping (玉屏公主)	Jieyu, of the Cao clan	

=== Daughters of Emperor Lizong ===
Year	Prince Consort	Princess	Mother	References
1261	Yang Zhen (杨镇)	Princess Duanxiao of Zhouhan (周汉端孝公主)	Noble Consort Huishun, of the Jia clan	
NN	Xie Bi (谢壁)	Princess Zhenzhu (珍珠公主)	NN	
NN	Zhu Jun (朱浚)	Lady	NN	

=== Daughters of Emperor Duzong ===
Prince Consort	Princess	Mother	References
Fang Daosheng (方道盛)	Princess Xin'an Zhuangyi (信安庄懿公主)	Xiurong, of the Yu clan	
Huang Cai (黄材)	Princess Zhenjing (贞静公主)	Xiurong, of the Yu clan	
Jiang Rixin (江日新)	Princess	Empress Dowager Yang	

== Daughters of imperial princes ==
=== Sons of Emperor Xuanzu ===
Daughters of Zhao Tingmei, Prince Dao of Fu
Year	Prince Consort	Princess	References
Before 1014	Tian Shouxin (田守信)	Princess of Changqing commandery (长清郡主)	
NN	Cao Xu (曹珝)	Princess Daning (大宁公主)	
982	Han Chongye (韩崇业)	Princess Yunyang (云阳公主)	

=== Sons of Emperor Taizu of Song ===
Line of Zhao Dezhao, Prince Yi of Yan
Year	Prince Consort	Princess	Issue	References
Zhao Weiji (赵惟吉)
NN	Xiang Chuanfan (向传范)	1.Princess of Anfu County	5 Sons: 1. Xiang Zhen (向缜); 2. Xiang Zai (向縡); 3. Xiang Yi (向绎); 4. Xiang Zong (向总); 5. Xiang Hui (向绘); 6 Daughters	
NN	Xiang Zhongmo (向仲模)	2.Princess of Wannian Commandery		

Line of Zhao Defang, Prince Kanghui of Qin
Prince Consort	Princess	Mother	References
Cui Congshi (崔从湜)	Princess of Yongshou County		
Zhao Congyu (赵从郁)
Ge Zongjian (葛宗简)	1.Lady	Lady Xue	
Li Congzhi (李从之)	2.Lady	Lady Xue	
Zhang Huaji (张化基)	3.Lady	Lady Xue	
Zhang Yongning (张永宁)	4.Lady	Lady Xue	
Zhao Shijiang (赵世将)
Liu Hanqing (刘汉卿)	1.Lady	Lady Li	
Wang Anqi (王安期)	2.Lady	Lady Li	
Li Jun (李浚)	3. Lady	Lady Li	
Zhao Bogui (赵伯圭), Prince Xianjing of Chong (崇宪靖王)
Shi Mijian (史弥坚)	Princess of Xin'an commandery (新安郡主)	Lady Song, Lady of Qin	
Zheng Sizong (郑嗣宗)	Princess of Jiaxing county (嘉兴县主)	Lady Song, Lady of Qin	
Zhang Sixu (张似续)	Princess of Yongjia commandery (永嘉郡主)	Lady Song, Lady of Qin	
Zhao Shikui (赵师揆), Prince Gonghui of Feng (沣恭惠王)
Fan Shen (范莘)	Princess of Xianning commandery (咸宁郡主)	NN	
Wu Pu (吴璞)	Princess of Heyi commandery (和义郡主)	NN	

=== Sons of Emperor Taizong ===
Line of Zhao Yuanxi
Prince Consort	Princess	Mother	References
Zhao Yuanxi, Crown Prince Zhaocheng (昭成太子)
Zhang Chengyan (张承衍)	Princess of Le'an commandery (乐安郡主)	NN	

Line of Zhao Yuanfen
Prince Consort	Princess	Mother	References
Zhao Yuanfen (赵元份), Prince Gongjing of Shang (商恭靖王)
Bu Zhailang (补斋郎)	Princess of Huayuan county	Lady Li, Princess Consort Yong	
Zhao Yunrang (赵允让), Prince Anyi of Pu (濮安懿王)
Liu Chengxu (刘承绪)	Princess of Jian'an commandery	Lady Ren, Lady of Xianyou county	

Line of Zhao Yuanyan
Prince Consort	Princess	Mother	References
Zhao Yuanyan (赵元俨), Prince Gongsu of Zhou (周恭肃王)
Liu Congguang (刘从广)	1.NN	Lady Liu, Lady of Kang	
Cui Shangxian (崔上贤)	2.Princess of Chong'an commandery	Princess consort, lady Zhang	

=== Sons of Emperor Yingzong ===
Line of Zhao Hao
Prince Consort	Princess	Mother	References
Zhao Hao (赵颢), Prince Rong of Wu (吴荣王)
Liu Yan (刘言）	Princess of Jingzhao commandery (京兆郡主)	Lady of Chong, Feng Shouchong (冯守冲)	
Nie Shan (聂山)	Princess of Huayuan commandery (华原郡主)	Lady Pang Duohua (庞多花)	
Pan Gao (潘高)	Princess of Anding commandery (安定郡主)	Lady of Chong, Feng Shouchong (冯守冲)	
Hao Shidan (郝师旦)	Princess of Renshou commandery (仁寿郡主)	Lady of Chong, Feng Shouchong (冯守冲)	

Line of Zhao Yun
Prince Consort	Princess	Mother	References
Zhao Yun (赵頵), Prince Duanxian of Yi (益端献王)
Ren Shidao (任师道)	Princess of Yongjia commandery (永嘉郡主)	Lady of Wei and Yue, lady Wang (魏越国夫人王氏)	
Wang Jian (王健)	Princess of Heyi commandery (和义郡主)	Lady of Wei and Yue, lady Wang (魏越国夫人王氏)	
Gao Shishang (高世赏)	Princess of Daning commandery (大宁郡主)	Lady of Wei and Yue, lady Wang (魏越国夫人王氏)	
Wang Xiang (王庠)	Princess of Leping commandery (乐平郡主)	Lady of Wei and Yue, lady Wang (魏越国夫人王氏)	
Wang Zhongbi (王仲弼)	Princess of Qi'an commandery (齐安郡主)	Lady of Wei and Yue, lady Wang (魏越国夫人王氏)	
Wang Zongkui (王宗夔)	Princess of Yichun commandery (宜春郡主)	Lady of Wei and Yue, lady Wang (魏越国夫人王氏)	
Guo Zhang (郭璋)	Princess of Tong'an commandery (同安郡主)	Lady of Wei and Yue, lady Wang (魏越国夫人王氏)	

=== Sons of Emperor Shenzong of Song ===
Line of Zhao Yu
Year	Prince consort	Princess	Mother	References
Zhao Yu (赵俣), Prince of Yan (燕王)
1138	Emperor Xizong of Jin	Zhao Feiyan (赵飞燕)	Princess consort, lady Guo	

Line of Zhao Cai
Year	Prince consort	Princess	Mother	References
Zhao Cai (赵偲), Prince of Yue (越王)
1142	Emperor Xizong of Jin	Zhao Tanxiang (赵檀香)	Lady Lu	

=== Sons of Emperor Huizong of Song ===
Line of Zhao Shu
Year	Prince consort	Princess	Mother	References
Zhao Shu (赵枢), Prince Su (肃王)
1138	Emperor Xizong of Jin	Zhao Yuqiang	NN	

Line of Zhao Qi
Prince consort	Princess	Mother	References
Zhao Qi (赵杞), Prince of Jing (景王)
Son of Han Fang (韩昉)	Zhao Hanyu (赵含玉)	Lady Cao, lady of the commandery	

Line of Zhao Yu
Prince consort	Princess	Mother	References
Zhao Yu (赵棫), Prince Yi (益王)
Son of Ke Xi (克锡)	Zhao Hutou (赵虎头)	Zhou Jin (周瑾)	

Line of Zhao Shi
Prince consort	Princess	Mother	References
Zhao Shi(赵栻), Prince of He (和王)
Du Anshi (杜安石)	Princess of Leping commandery (乐平县主)	Princess consort, Li Shunying (李舜英)	
Wang An (王安)	Lady Zhao	Lady Liu	
