= Gaozong Emperor =

Gaozong Emperor can refer to several Emperors of China, such as:

- Emperor Gaozong of Tang, ruling from 649 to 683.
- Emperor Gaozong of Song, founder of the Southern Song dynasty, ruling from 1127 to 1162.

== See also ==
- Gaozong (disambiguation)
