= 高宗 =

高宗 may refer to several Chinese and Korean monarchs.

- See Gaozong (disambiguation) for Chinese monarchs
- See Gojong (disambiguation) for Korean monarchs
