= Consort Xing =

Consort Xing may refer to:

- Noble Consort Xing (died 1103), concubine of Emperor Shenzong of Song
- Empress Xing (1106–1139), wife of Emperor Gaozong of Song

== See also ==
- Consort Xin (disambiguation)
