= Zhao Fu =

Chinese prince (1127–1129)

Zhao Fu 趙旉

Emperor of the Song dynasty
- Reign: 26 March – 20 April 1129
- Predecessor: Emperor Gaozong
- Successor: Emperor Gaozong
- Regent: Empress Meng
- Born: Zhao Fu; 23 July 1127
- Died: 28 July 1129 (aged 2)
Posthumous name
- Crown Prince Yuanyi (元懿太子)
- Father: Emperor Gaozong of Song

Zhao Fu (趙旉; 23 July 1127 – 28 July 1129) was the only son of Emperor Gaozong of Song. He died at the age of two. After his death, his father had no more direct male descendants and, unable to father more children, had to adopt distant male relatives and pass the throne to one of them.

== Life ==
On March 26, 1129, Zhao Fu gained his throne to a mutiny that was instigated by the palace guards led by Miao Fu (苗傅) and Liu Zhengyan (劉正彥) then forced Gaozong to abdicate in favor of his one-year-old son Zhao Fu who ruled with the era name Mingshou. Zhao Fu was merely a figure head as Miao, Liu, and the regent the former Empress Meng were the real power behind the throne.

=== Deposal ===
On April 20, 1129, Miao and Liu was defeated by Gaozong's loyal army led by Han Shizhong and were both executed for treason. Empress Meng stepped down from the regency, and Zhao Fu himself would be forced to abdicate to Emperor Gaozong after having ruled for 25 days.

=== Death ===
Zhao Fu suffered a seizure after his deposal and died.

== Legacy ==
Zhao Fu is not usually considered a Song emperor by traditional historians, nor was his era name recognised due to his 25-day reign. His death forced Emperor Gaozong to look for a suitable heir from Emperor Taizu's line as most of Emperor Taizong's descendants were taken in the Jingkang Incident. The mutiny would cause Emperor Gaozong to move his capital to Jiankang.
