= Empress Wang (Huizong) =

Song dynasty empress

Empress Wang (1084–1108) was a Chinese empress consort of the Song Dynasty, married to Emperor Huizong of Song.

Wang came from the capital, and her father served as prefect. She was selected to be the primary consort of Prince Huizeng by his legal mother Dowager Empress Xiang in 1099. After the wedding, the Empress Dowager gave two concubines, Consort Zheng and Consort Wang, to prince Huizeng. When Huizeng succeeded his brother as emperor in 1100, Wang became his empress.

Empress Wang gave birth to a daughter in 1101, but had no more children after that. Wang played no dominant part and emperor Huizeng was reportedly indifferent to her.

== Title ==
- During the reign of Emperor Shenzong of Song (25 January 1067 – 1 April 1085)
  - Lady Wang (王氏; from 1084 )
- During the reign of Emperor Zhenzong of Song (1 April 1085 – 23 February 1100)
  - Princess Consort (王妃; from 1099)
  - Lady of Guo State (順國夫人; from 1099)
- During the reign of Emperor Huizong of Song (23 February 1100 – 18 January 1126)
  - Empress (皇后; from 23 February 1100)
  - Empress Jinghe (靖和皇后; from 1108)
  - Empress Huigong (惠恭皇后; from 1110)
  - Empress Xiangong (顯恭皇后; from 1137)

== Issue ==
As Empress:

- Zhao Huan, Qinzong Emperor (欽宗 趙桓; 1100–1156), Huizong's first son
- Princess Rongde (榮德帝姬; b. 1103), personal name Jinnu (金奴), Huizong's second daughter

== Notes ==
Chinese royalty
Preceded by Empress Liu (Zhezong)	Empress of China; 1100–1108	Succeeded by Empress Xiansu
