= Xiansu =

Xiansu may refer to:

- Empress Zheng (Song dynasty) (1079 – 1130), also known as Empress Xiansu, empress of Emperor Huizong of Song.
- Hu Xiansu (1894 – 1968), Chinese botanist, scholar, literary critic and educator.
