= Empress Meng =

Empress Zhaoci 昭慈皇后
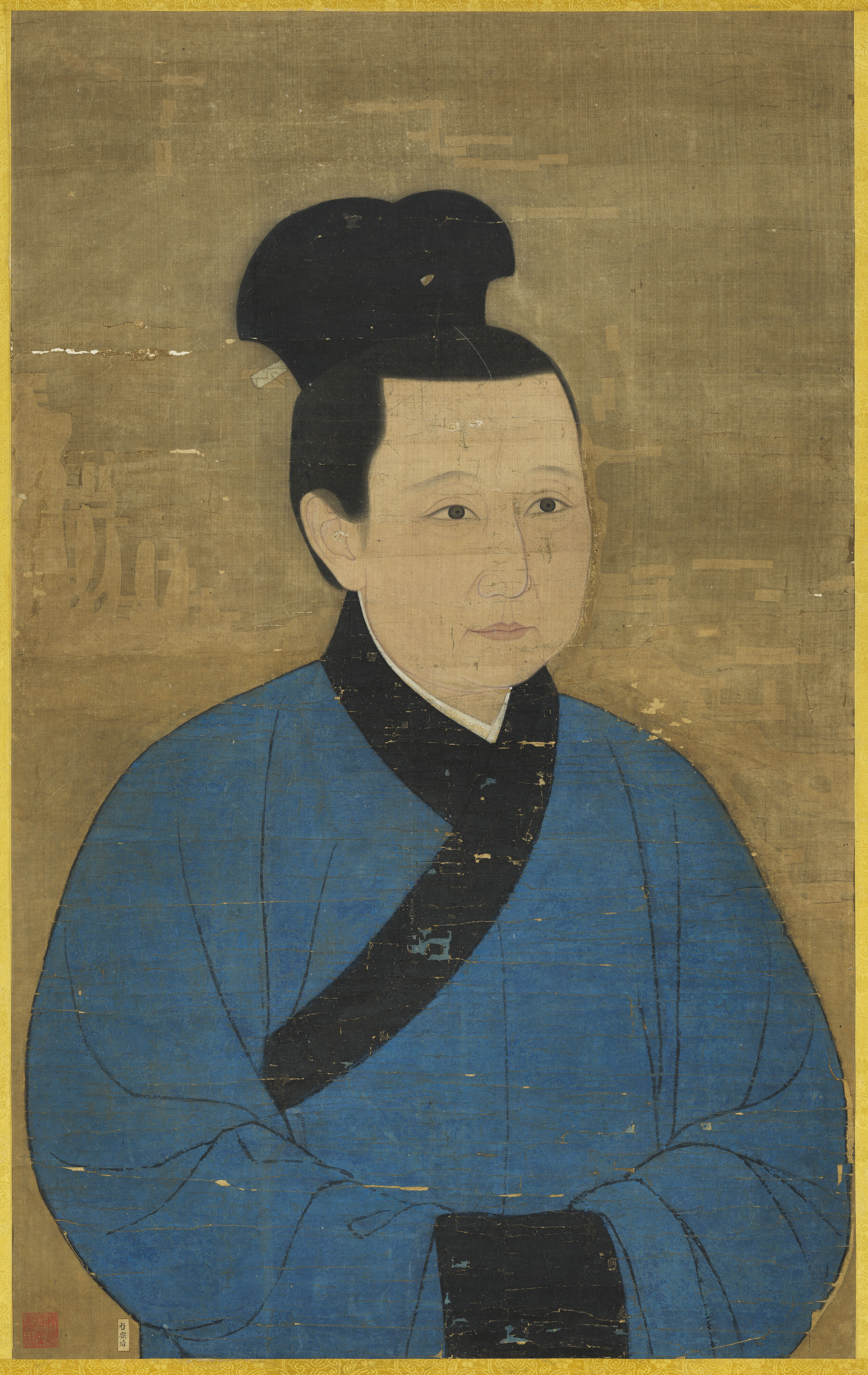

Empress consort of the Northern Song dynasty
- Tenure: 23 June 1092 – 17 October 1096
- Predecessor: Empress Xiang
- Successor: Empress Liu
- Born: 1073
- Died: 12 May 1131 (aged 58)
- Spouse: Emperor Zhezong of Song
Posthumous name
- Empress Zhaoci Shengxian (昭慈聖獻皇后); Empress Yuanyou (元祐皇后)
- Father: Meng Yuen

Empress Meng (Chinese: 昭慈圣献皇后; 1073 – 1131) was a daughter of Meng Yuen and the Chinese empress consort of the Song dynasty, married to Emperor Zhezong of Song. She served as a regent of China in 1127, and during the minority of Emperor Zhang, the son of Emperor Gaozong of Song, who was temporarily placed upon the throne for 25 days in 1129. She played a significant political role in Chinese politics: first by legitimizing the Da Chu dynasty in 1127, and then ending it by legitimizing Emperor Gaozong of Song as the heir of the Song dynasty.

== Life ==
=== Empress ===
Meng was selected to become the primary spouse and empress of Emperor Zhezong by the Empress Dowager Regent Gao, and the wedding was conducted in 1092. She came from a "literati family", was very well-educated, and from her introduction to court, she was taught "wifely etiquette".

The relationship between Meng and Zhezong was not a good one, and Zhezong resented her, possibly because she had been chosen for him by the Empress Dowager Regent Gao. Reportedly, he tolerated, and maybe even encouraged, his favorite, Consort Liu, to be rude to Meng. Her mother-in-law, Dowager Empress Xiang, however, had a very good impression of her and a good relationship with her, and took her side against Liu, though she later admitted, that both Meng and Liu had a temper and were both to blame for their infected rivalry.

=== Witchcraft scandal ===
In 1096, a scandal occurred when Empress Meng was accused of witchcraft. When her infant daughter became ill, the empress asked her sister for advice. Her sister brought her "talisman-water", which was used by daoist-priest to cure illness. Meng protested because such practices were banned in the palace, but the emperor commented that it was harmless. Nonetheless, rumors of witchcraft started to surround the empress. When the baby's illness grew worse, the empress noticed "token paper money" beside the child and suspected Consort Liu of using witchcraft against her. Soon afterwards, a nun, a eunuch, and the adoptive mother of Meng were accused of having used witchcraft to help the empress, thereby implicating her. Thirty palace women and eunuchs were tortured during the investigation. The nun and the eunuch were executed, accused of having used black magic toward Consort Liu. The adoptive mother of Meng, accused of having used magic to make the emperor fall in love with the empress, was also executed. Empress Meng's title was stripped from her and she was sent to a Daoist nunnery.

In 1100, Emperor Zhezong was succeeded by his half-brother, Emperor Huizong of Song. He had his legal mother, the Dowager Empress Xiang, appointed his co-regent. Xiang, who had always favoured Meng before Liu and opposed the deposition and banishment of Meng, reinstated the Imperial rank to Meng, granting her the title of Empress Dowager. Upon the death of her benefactor Empress Xiang in 1102, however, she was forced to return to the nunnery.

=== Regent of Da Chu ===
Emperor Huizong abdicated in favour of his son Emperor Qinzong in 1126. In 1127, the capital of Kaifeng was captured by the Jurchen during the Jin–Song Wars. The Emperor Qinzong was deposed, and he, as well as his predecessor Emperor Huizong and most of the Imperial family and court, was captured and exiled to Manchuria in what was called the Jingkang Incident. The consorts and concubines and palace women of the emperors who were captured were distributed among the Jurchen. Though residing in Kaifeng, Empress Dowager Meng was not taken captive with the rest of the court, simply because she was living in a temple and not at the Imperial court.

Instead of annexing the Song land, the Jurchen Jin dynasty created a buffer state named Chu, and installed Zhang Bangchang, a former prime minister of the Song Dynasty, as the emperor of a puppet dynasty named Da Chu. The only member of the Song dynasty left in the capital of Kaifeng was empress dowager Meng, which gave her great status. Zhang Bangchang asked for her support to ensure some sort of dynastic legitimacy to his rule. He appointed her regent with the title Empress Dowager Yuanyou.

Her reign lasted for two months: in mid 1127, Emperor Gaozong of Song, the 9th son of Emperor Huizong, who had fled the capital before it fell, returned to the city, and she declared him to be the rightful Emperor and stepped down from regency, thereby also ending the Da Chu dynasty and state.

Emperor Gaozong established the Southern Song dynasty, and, in gratitude for her act, treated her with great honors and gave her the title Empress Dowager Longyou.

=== Empress dowager of Southern Song ===
In 1129, the commander Miao Fu and vice commander Liu Cheng-yen seized control of the capital of Linan, forced Emperor Gaozong to abdicate in favor of his three-year-old son, Zhang, and placed Empress Dowager Meng as regent during his minority. She did accept the position of regent, but made it clear that she opposed the coup. Her reign lasted for 25 days, before Gaozong regained his throne. Because of her expressed loyalty, she was honoured by Emperor Gaozong when he regained his position as emperor.

In late 1129, Emperor Gaozong evacuated Linan and sent empress dowager Meng with an Imperial guard to Chiang-hsi, aware that she symbolized dynastic legitimacy and must not be captured by the Jurchen. Equally aware of this, the Jurchen pursued her and almost succeeded in capturing her, but she was able to return to Linan when it was secured and given a grand welcome. The Emperor treated her with the same honors entitled to his mother for the rest of her life, and also gave her relatives official positions.

She died in 1131.

== Notes ==
Chinese royalty
Preceded by Empress Xiang	Empress of China; 1092–1096	Succeeded by Empress Liu (Zhezong)
