= Empress Qincheng =

Concubine of the Chinese emperor Shenzong of Song (died 1102)

Empress Qincheng (欽成皇后), personal name unknown, was a concubine of Emperor Shenzong of Song and the mother of Emperor Zhezong of Song.

== Life ==
She was born in Kaifeng (Present day Kaifeng, Henan Province). Her birth father Cui Jie died young and her mother Li remarried to a man named Zhu Shi'an and she therefore took the surname of Zhu. She later became his adopted daughter.

When she was sixteen years old, she entered the palace as a royal servant. After eight years as a maid, she caught the eye of Emperor Shenzong and was granted the title of Cairen (才人), the year after she was promoted to Jieyu (婕妤) and was further promoted to Zhaorong (昭容). She gave birth to three children: Zhao Yong (the future Emperor Zhenzong), Zhao Si and the Princess Xu Gouchang.

In 1085, her son Emperor Zhenzong ascended to the throne and she was granted the title of Imperial Consort Dowager Shengrui (聖瑞皇太妃). Emperor Zhenzong's legal wife the Empress Xiang was given the rank of Empress Dowager instead.

In 1100, Zhao Yong died without any heirs. The Prime Minister Zhang Dun suggested that Consort Zhu's younger son Zhao Si to inherit the throne but Empress Dowager Xiang, fearful that the Zhu's would have immense power, placed another prince Zhao Ji (Emperor Huizong) on the throne.

Two years later, Consort Zhu died and Emperor Huizong granted her the posthumous title Empress Qincheng (欽成皇后 literally: "The admirable and becoming Empress")

== Titles ==
- During the reign of Emperor Renzong (24 March 1022 – 30 April 1063):
  - Lady Zhu (朱氏)
- During the reign of Emperor Shenzong (25 January 1067 – 1 April 1085):
  - Cairen (才人; from 1075)
  - Jieyu (婕妤; from 1076)
  - Zhaorong (昭容; from 1079)
  - Xianfei (賢妃; from 1082)
  - Defei (德妃; from 1084)
- During the reign of Emperor Zhezong (1 April 1085 – 23 February 1100):
  - Dowager Imperial Consort Shengrui (聖瑞皇太妃; from 1085)
- During the reign of Emperor Huizong (23 February 1100 – 18 January 1126):
  - Empress Qincheng (欽成皇后; from 1102)

== Issue ==
As cairen:

- Princess Xianmu (賢穆帝姬; d. 1111), Emperor Shenzong's 3rd daughter
- Zhao Xu, Emperor Zhezong of Song (哲宗 趙煦; 1077–1100), Emperor Shenzong's sixth son

As xianfei:

- Zhao Shi, Prince Churongxian (楚榮憲王 趙似; 1083–1106), Emperor Shenzong's 13th son

As defei:

- Princess Xianjing (賢靜帝姬; 1085–1115), Emperor Shenzong's 10th daughter
