= Longping Ji =

- Author: Zeng Gong (disputed)
- Language: Classical Chinese
- Subject: history of the Song dynasty
- Published: 1142
- Publication place: Song dynasty

Longping Ji
- Chinese: 隆平集
Transcriptions
Standard Mandarin
- Hanyu Pinyin: Lóngpíng Jí
- Wade–Giles: Lung-p'ing chi

Longping Ji (隆平集; "The Collection of Magnificent Pacification") is a Chinese history book detailing the history of the Song dynasty under its first 5 emperors (Emperor Taizu, Emperor Taizong, Emperor Zhenzong, Emperor Renzong, and Emperor Yingzong), or the period from 960 to 1067. The book was published in 1142 and attributed to the famous writer Zeng Gong (1019–1083), but modern historians believe it's more likely an anonymous author simply borrowed Zeng Gong's famous name for marketing purposes.

== Structure ==
The book contains 20 chapters and is divided into 26 sections. The structure follows that of the Tang Huiyao, which means it was not written as a chronicle but treated political and social topics separately.

The first 3 chapters focus on records of the 5 reigns. The sections are:

1. Imperial Succession (聖續)
2. Capital (都城)
3. Official Titles (官名)
4. Literary Academies (館閣)
5. Prefectures and Counties (郡縣)
6. Monasteries and Temples (寺觀)
7. Selections of Officials (取士)
8. Reforms of Injurious Practices (革弊)
9. Frugality (節儉)
10. Councilors of State (宰執)
11. Punishments (刑罰)
12. Census (戶口)
13. Miscellaneous Topics (雜錄)

The last 17 chapters contain 284 biographical sketches. The sections are:

1. Ministers (宰臣)
2. Assistant Executives of the Secretariat-Chancellery (參知政事)
3. Commissioners of Military Affairs (樞密)
4. Pacification Commissioners (宣徽使)
5. Descendants of Princes (王後)
6. Foreign Countries (偽國; "Illegitimate Countries")
7. Attendants (侍從)
8. Righteous Confucians (儒學行義)
9. Military generals (武臣)
10. Barbarians (夷狄)
11. Demons and Criminals (妖寇)
