= Consort Xin =

Consort Xin or Empress Xin may refer to:

== Consorts with the surname Xin ==
- Empress Xin (Zhang Zuo's wife) (fl. 354)
- Empress Xin (Shi Siming's wife) (died 761?)

== Consorts with the title Consort Xin ==
- Noble Consort Xin (1737–1764), concubine of the Qianlong Emperor
- Consort Xin (Jiaqing) (1783–1822), concubine of the Jiaqing Emperor

== See also ==
- Consort Xing (disambiguation)
