= Empress Zhu (Song dynasty) =

Empress Renhuai 仁懷皇后

Empress consort of the Northern Song dynasty
- Tenure: 1126–1127
- Predecessor: Empress Xiansu
- Successor: Empress Xianjie
- Born: 1102; Bianjing
- Died: 1127 (aged 24–25)
- Spouse: Emperor Qinzong
- Clan: Family name: Zhu (朱)

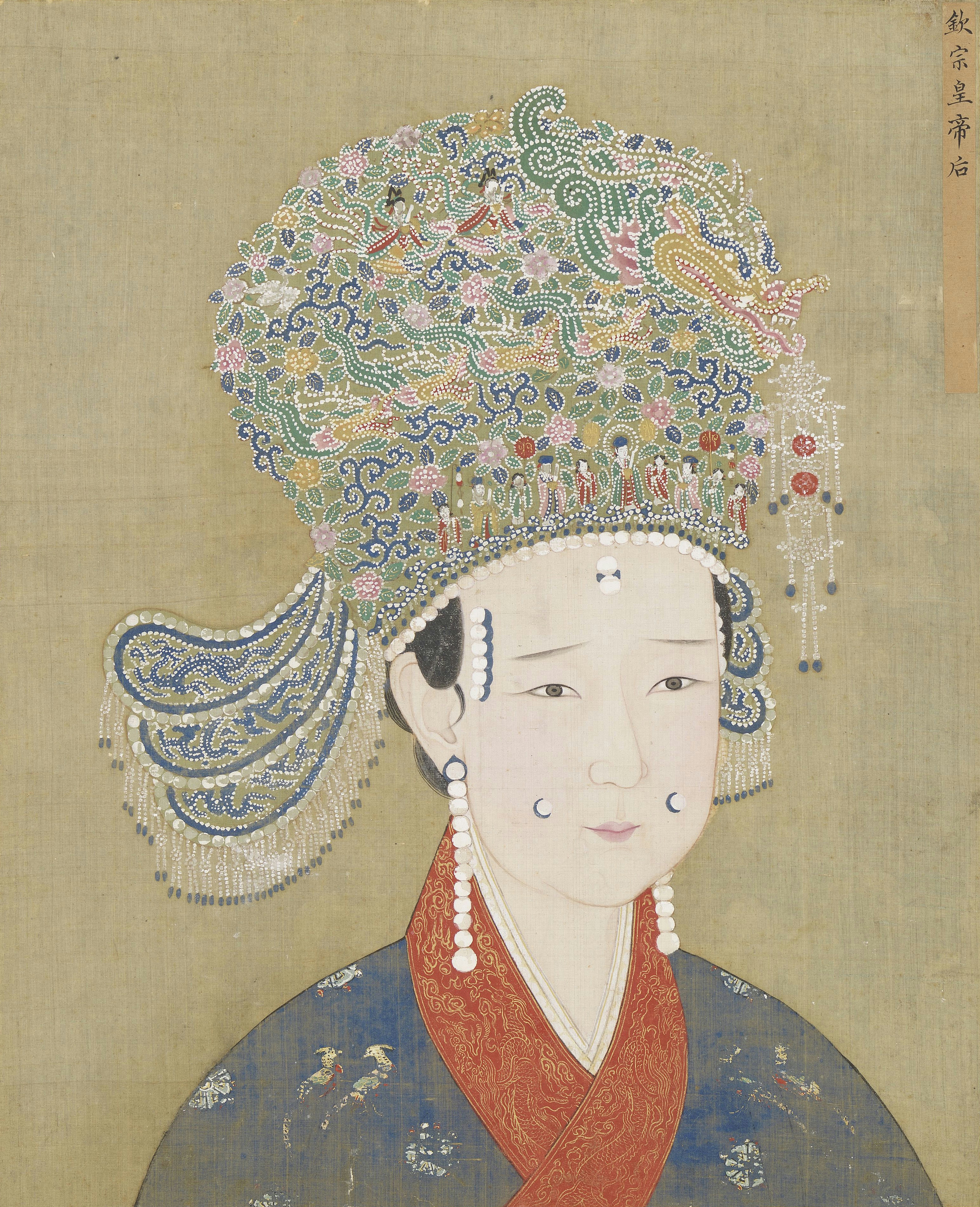
Empress Renhuai

Empress Zhu (1102–1127) was a Chinese empress consort of the Song dynasty, married to Emperor Qinzong of Song.

Zhu was born in Bianjing in 1102. Zhu was married to Qinzong as his primary consort in 1116. In 1126, Emperor Huizong abdicated in favor of his son, Emperor Qinzong. Zhu, as his primary consort, was appointed to the position of empress.

In 1127, the capital of Bianjing was captured by the Jurchen during the Jin–Song Wars. The Emperor Qinzong was deposed, and him, as well as his predecessor Emperor Huizong and most of the Imperial family and court, over 3000 people, were captured and exiled to Manchuria in what was called the Jingkang Incident.

They were first taken to the Jurchen capital, many of them dying on the way. The Imperial consorts, concubines, palace women and eunuchs who were taken captured, were distributed among the Jurchen as slaves. Her father-in-law was allowed to keep five of his spouses, including his empress, because they were too old to be of interest as war prizes. Empress Zhu, however, was young and described as a beauty, and not expected to be allowed to remain with her spouse. Upon her arrival, she was ordered to take a bath. Humiliated, she committed suicide to avoid sexual abuse.

Chinese royalty
Preceded by Empress Xiansu	Empress of China; 1126–1127	Succeeded by Empress Xing
