= Noble Consort Xing =

Noble Consort Yimu 懿穆貴妃
- Born: Song dynasty
- Died: 1103; Beijing, Song dynasty
- Spouse: Emperor Shenzong of Song
- Issue: Zhao Jin, Prince Hui; Zhao Xian, Prince Ji; Zhao Jia, Prince Yudaohui; Zhao Ti, Prince Xuchonghui
Posthumous name
- Noble Consort Yimu 懿穆貴妃
- Clan: Xing ( 邢氏; by birth); House of Zhao (by marriage)

Noble Consort Yimu (Chinese: 懿穆貴妃, pinyin: Yì mù guìfēi; d. 1103) of the Xing clan, was a Chinese imperial concubine of Emperor Shenzong of the Song dynasty.

== Life ==
Lady Xing's given name was not recorded in the history. Also, where she was born or who her parents were is still being determined. She entered the palace and became a servant. The Shenzong Emperor began favouring her and made her one of his concubines. On 21 June 1071, Xiang gave birth to Shenzong's 2nd son, Zhao Jin, who would die prematurely two days later, on 23 June. She was promoted to a Chongrong (充容) and gave birth to another son on 15 July 1074, Zhao Xian. The 5th Prince Zhao Xian would die prematurely on 26 January 1076. Xiang was further promoted to a Wanyi (婉儀), 5th rank Imperial Concubine. Concubine Xian had two more sons, Zhao Jia, born on 7 February 1077, and Zhao Ti, born in 1078. Neither survived to adulthood.

After her husband died, his successor Zhao Xu elevated her to the rank of Able Consort (賢妃; pinyin: xián fēi) in 1085 and Noble Consort (貴妃; pinyin: guì fēi). Noble Consort Ziang died in 1103 and Emperor Huizong honoured her as Noble Consort Yimu (懿穆貴妃).

== Title ==
- During the reign of Emperor Yingzong of Song (1 May 1063 – 25 January 1067)
  - Lady Xing (邢氏; from Unknown date)
- During the reign of Emperor Shenzong of Song (25 January 1067 – 1 April 1085)
  - Palace Attendant (御侍; from Unknown date)
  - Lady of Yongjia county (永嘉郡君; from April 1069)
  - Beauty (美人; from June 1071)
  - Lady of Complete Countenance (充容; from 1074)
  - Lady of Graceful Ceremony (婉儀; from February 1077)
- During the reign of Emperor Zhenzong of Song (1 April 1085 – 23 February 1100)
  - Able Consort (賢妃; from December 1085)
  - Noble Consort (貴妃; from 1100)
- During the reign of Emperor Huizong of Song (23 February 1100 – 18 January 1126)
  - Noble Consort Yimu (懿穆貴妃; from 1103)

== Issue ==
- As a Beauty:
  - Zhao Jin, Prince Hui (惠王 趙僅; 21 June 1071 -23 June 1071), The emperor's 2nd son
- As Lady of Complete Countenance:
  - Zhao Xian, Prince Ji (冀王 趙僩; 15 July 1074 – 26 January 1076), The emperor's 5th son
- Lady of Graceful Ceremony:
  - Zhao Jia, Prince Yudaohui (豫悼惠王 趙價; 7 February 1077 – 1078), The emperor's 7th son
  - Zhao Ti, Prince Xuchonghui (徐沖惠王 趙倜; 1078–1081), The emperor's 8th son
