= Empress Xing =

Empress Xianjie 憲節皇后

Empress consort of the Southern Song dynasty
- Tenure: 15 June 1127 – 29 June 1139
- Predecessor: Empress Renhuai
- Successor: Empress Xiansheng
- Born: 1106; Bianjing
- Died: 29 June 1139 (aged c. 33)
- Spouse: Emperor Gaozong
- Clan: Family name: Xing (邢)

Empress Xing (1106 – 1139), personal name Xing Shi, was a Chinese empress of the Song dynasty, married to Emperor Gaozong of Song.

Xing was from Bianjing, and was selected to be the primary consort of Gaozong, then a Prince. Their marriage was conducted in 1115, when she was eight years old.

In 1126, Emperor Huizong abdicated in favor of his son, Emperor Qinzong, the elder brother of Gaozong. In 1127, the capital of Kaifeng was captured by the Jurchen during the Jin–Song Wars. The Emperor Qinzong was deposed, and him, as well as his predecessor Emperor Huizong and most of the Imperial family and court, over 3000 people, was captured and exiled to Manchuria in what was called the Jingkang Incident. They were first taken to the Jurchen capital, many of them dying on the way. The Imperial consorts, concubines, palace women and eunuchs who were taken captured, were distributed among the Jurchen as slaves. Consort Xing was among those captured and taken away. Nothing more is known of her except that she was coveted by her captors, that she attempted suicide to escape abuses but was unsuccessful, and that she died in captivity in 1139.

Gaozong himself avoided capture because he was absent from the capital when it fell. Gaozong then organized the resistance against further Jurchen invasion, declaring himself Emperor in late 1127 and establishing the Southern Song dynasty. Knowing his primary consort Xing was still alive in captivity, he declared her to be Empress in absentia.

Emperor Gaozong kept the position of Empress vacant because he did not know whether Consort Xing was still alive or not: when she died in 1139, the Jurchen kept her death a secret, and it was not until his mother, Consort Wei, was released and allowed to join him, that he learned that she was dead. Her remains was returned to be buried the same year. It was not until 1143 that Gaozong was persuaded by his mother and his ministers to appoint a new Empress, and he promoted Consort Wu to the position.

== Notes ==
Chinese royalty
| Preceded by Empress Renhuai | Empress of China; 1127–1139 | Succeeded by Empress Wu (Song dynasty) |
