= Miao Fu =

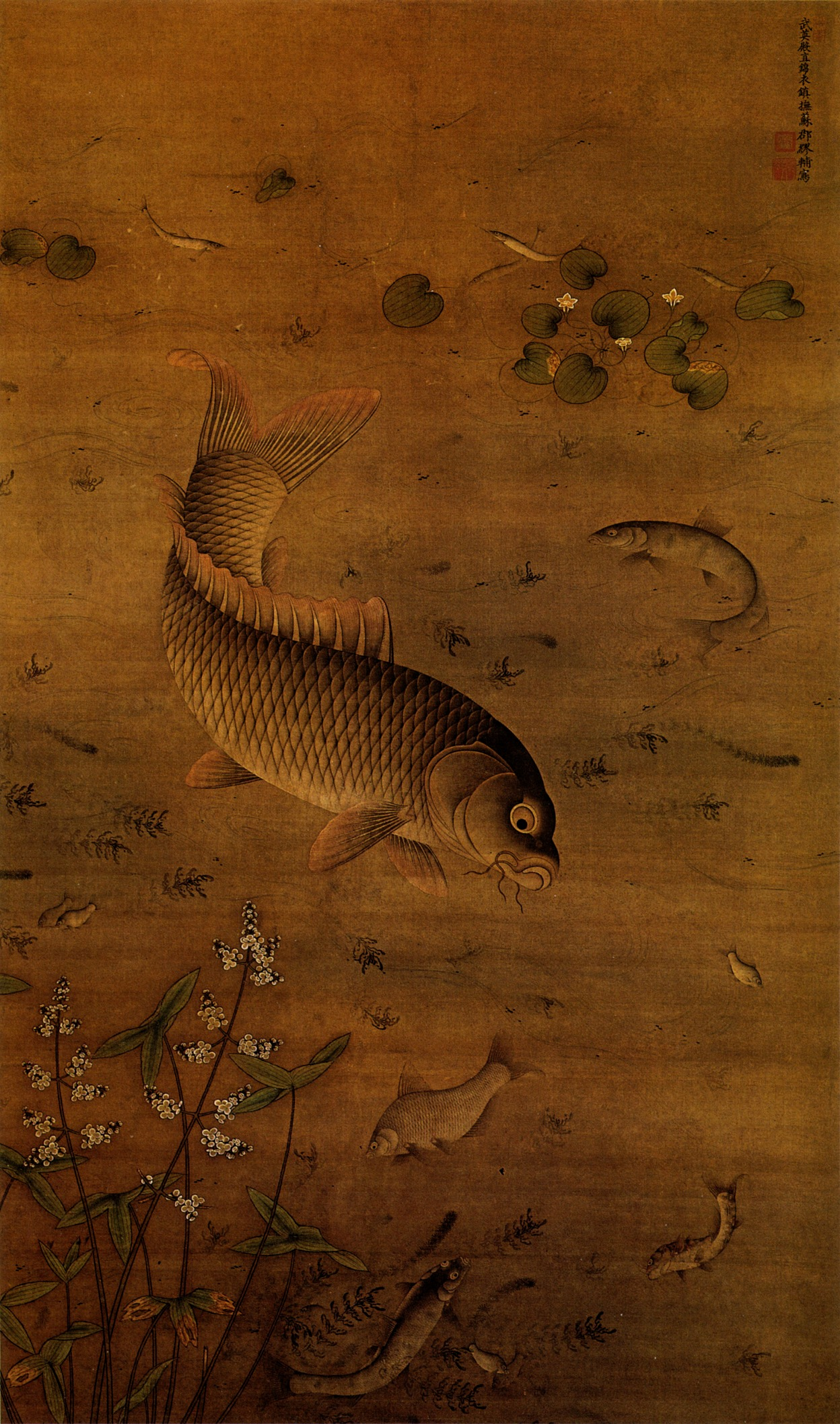
Miao Fu, Fish and Aquatic Grass, Palace Museum

Miao Fu (simplified Chinese: 缪辅; traditional Chinese: 繆輔; pinyin: Miào Fǔ; Wade–Giles: Miao Fu), was a Chinese imperial painter during the Xuande era of the Ming dynasty. His birth and death years are unknown.

Miao Fu was born in Suzhou. He was known for painting swimming fish.
