= Empress Liu (Zhezong) =

Empress Zhaohuai 昭懷

Empress consort of the Song dynasty
- Tenure: 1100 – 23 June 1100
- Predecessor: Empress Meng
- Successor: Empress Wang (Huizong)
- Born: 1079
- Died: 1113 (aged 33–34)
- Spouse: Emperor Zhezong

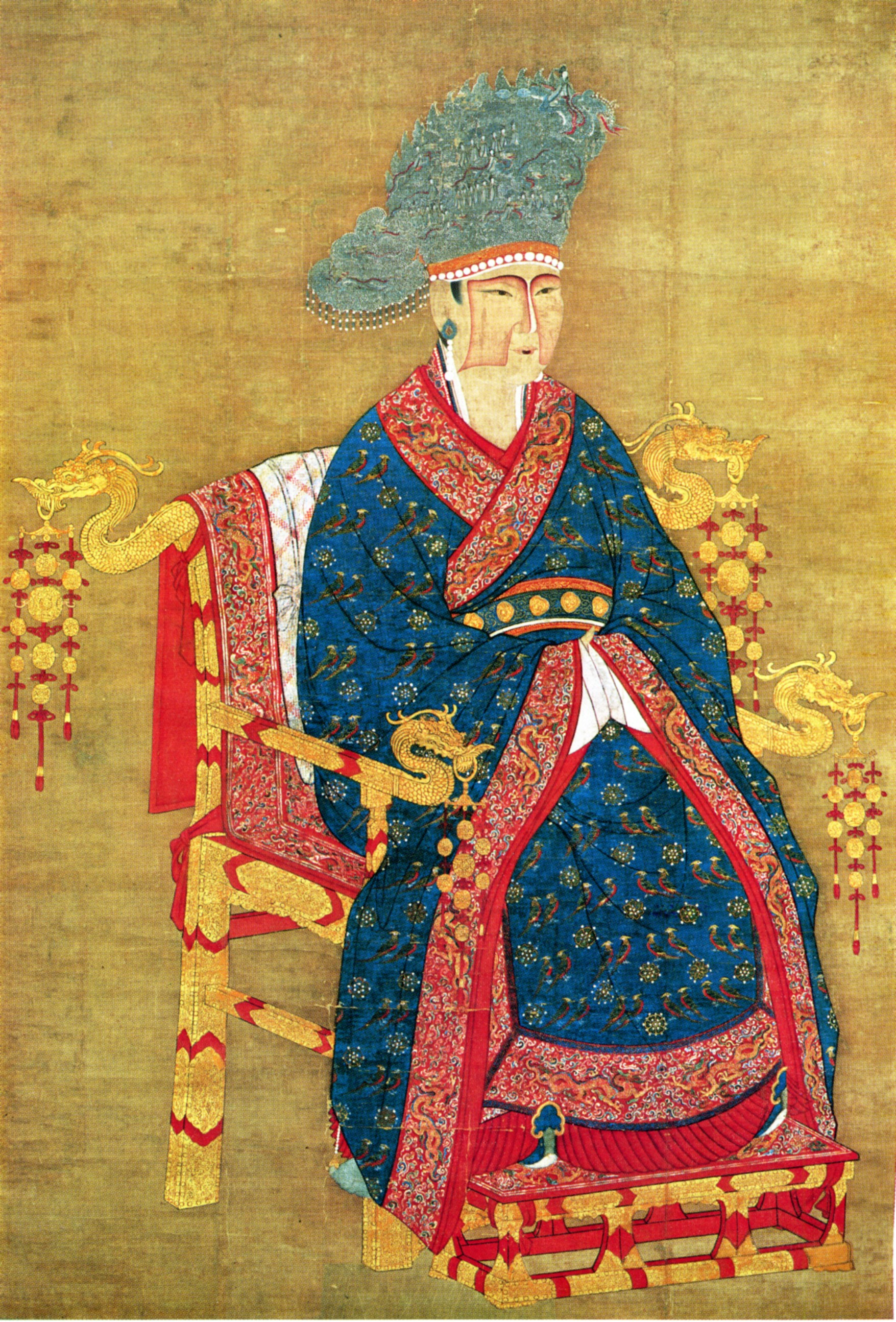
Zhangyi Empress Liu of Hangzhou of the Emperor Zhenzong of the Song dynasy. Hanging scroll, color on silk.

Empress Liu (昭懷皇后; 1079 – 1113) was a Chinese empress consort of the Song dynasty, married to Emperor Zhezong of Song.

== Life ==
Liu's background is not known. She was selected as one of the consorts of Zhezong, while Empress Meng became his empress. However, Consort Liu was to become his personal favourite. They had one son and two daughters together.

=== Conflict with Empress Meng ===
The relationship between Meng and Zhezong was not a good one, and Zhezong resented her, possible because she had been chosen for him by the Empress Dowager Regent Gao. Reportedly, he tolerated, and maybe even encouraged, Consort Liu, to be rude to empress Meng. Her mother-in-law, Dowager Empress Xiang, however, favoured empress Meng against her, though she later admitted, that both Meng and Liu had a temper and were both to blame for their infected rivalry, which caused several scenes at court.

In 1096, a scandal occurred when empress Meng was accused of witchcraft. When her infant daughter became ill, the empress had asked her sister for advice. Her sister had brought her "talisman-water", which was used by daoist-priest to cure illness. Meng had protested because such practices were banned in the palace, but the emperor commented that it was harmless. Nonetheless, rumors of witchcraft started to surround the empress. When the baby's illness grew worse, the empress noticed "token paper money" beside the child and suspected Consort Liu of using witchcraft against her. Soon after, a nun, a eunuch, and the adoptive mother of Meng was accused of having used witchcraft to help the empress, thereby implicating her. Thirty palace women and eunuchs were tortured during the investigation. The nun and the eunuch were executed, accused of having used black magic toward Liu, and the adoptive mother of Meng was executed accused of having used magic to make the emperor fall in love with the empress. Empress Meng herself was stripped from her title and sent to a Daoist nunnery.

=== Empress and dowager ===
In 1099, Liu had a son with the emperor, which gave him the wish to make her empress. In 27 December 1100, Consort Liu was elevated to the position of empress, which was not approved by Empress Dowager Xiang and met with protests from several officials, as many blamed Liu for the witch trial and demotion of empress Meng.

In 1100, Emperor Zhezong was succeeded by his half-brother, Emperor Huizong of Song. He had his legal mother, the Dowager Empress Xiang, appointed his co-regent. Empress Xiang also used her power as co-regent to push her view, that Emperor Zhezong had done wrong by demoting Empress Meng in favour of Empress Liu. She declared, that the demotion had been forged, and that Meng should be given back the states of Empress, while Liu should bee stripped from hers. This led to a conflict with the council, who argued that an emperor could not change the status of his late brother's widow. The affairs ended with a compromise: on 23 June 1100, Xiang succeeded with having the status of empress returned to Meng, but was prevented from stripping Liu of her title, resulting in Emperor Zhezong having two Empress Dowagers.

Not much more is known of Empress Dowager Liu. In 1113, it was reported that she had been forced to commit suicide by "those close to her", after they had reported her to the ministers for meddling in state affairs, which caused the ministers to contemplate demoting her.

== Notes ==
Chinese royalty
Preceded by Empress Meng	Empress of China; 1100–1100	Succeeded by Empress Wang (Huizong)
