= Gaozong =

Gaozong (Chinese: 高宗) is the temple name of several Chinese monarchs:

- Emperor Yuan of Han (reign 49 BC – 33 BC)
- Emperor Gaozong of Tang (reign 649–683)
- Emperor Gaozong of Song (reign 1127–1162)
- Qianlong Emperor of the Qing dynasty (reign 1735–1799)
- Wu Ding of the Shang dynasty (reign: 1250 – 1192 BC)

== See also ==
- Gojong (disambiguation) (Korean romanization)
