= Gojong =

Gojong (Korean: 고종; Hanja: 高宗) is the temple name of several Korean monarchs.

It can refer to:

- Gojong of Goryeo (1195–1259)
- Gojong of Korea (1852–1919)

== See also ==
- Gaozong (disambiguation) (Chinese romanization)
