= Emperor Qinzong =

Emperor of Song China from 1126 to 1127

Emperor Qinzong of Song 宋欽宗
- Palace portrait on a hanging scroll, kept in the National Palace Museum, Taipei, Taiwan

Emperor of the Song dynasty
- Reign: 19 January 1126 – 20 March 1127
- Enthronement: 19 January 1126
- Predecessor: Emperor Huizong
- Successor: Emperor Gaozong
- Born: Zhao Dan (趙亶; 1100–1103); 23 May 1100
- Died: 14 June 1156 (aged 56)
- Burial: Yongxian Mausoleum (永獻陵; in present-day Gongyi, Henan)
- Consort(s): Empress Renhuai (m. 1116; died 1127)
- Issue Detail: Zhao Jin; Zhao Xun; Princess Roujia
Names
- Zhao Huan (趙桓)
Era name and dates
- Jingkang (靖康): 1126–1127
Regnal name
- Emperor Xiaoci Yuansheng (孝慈淵聖皇帝)
Posthumous name
- Emperor Gongwen Shunde Renxiao (恭文順德仁孝皇帝)
Temple name
- Qinzong (欽宗)
- House: Zhao
- Dynasty: Song (Northern Song)
- Father: Emperor Huizong
- Mother: Empress Xiangong

Chinese name
- Traditional Chinese: 宋欽宗
- Simplified Chinese: 宋钦宗
- Literal meaning: "Venerable Ancestor of Song"
Transcriptions
Standard Mandarin
- Hanyu Pinyin: Sòng Qīnzōng

Emperor Qinzong of Song (23 May 1100 – 14 June 1156), personal name Zhao Huan, was the ninth emperor of the Song dynasty of China and the last emperor of the Northern Song dynasty.

Emperor Qinzong was the eldest son and heir apparent of Emperor Huizong. His mother was Emperor Huizong's empress consort, Empress Wang. In 1126, when the forces of the Jurchen-led Jin dynasty invaded the Northern Song dynasty beginning the first siege of Bianjing. Frightened, Emperor Huizong intended to flee but was convinced by his officials to abdicate first and then flee. Huizong then abdicated and passed on his throne to Emperor Qinzong, and then assumed the title Taishang Huang ("Retired Emperor") himself and fled to the countryside. After the fall of Kaifeng that marked the end of the Northern Song and Qinzong and his father's subsequent capture by the Jin forces, they, along and his half-brother and their successor, Emperor Gaozong, were blamed for the Song dynasty's decline.

== Reign ==
Left to deal with the Jin invasion by himself, Emperor Qinzong appointed the general Li Gang (李綱) to lead the Song military to fend off the invaders. However, Emperor Qinzong was not a decisive leader and often made poor judgments. Eventually, he removed Li Gang from his appointment in the hope of starting peace talks with the Jin Empire and sent his younger brother Zhao Gou to negotiate but he was captured and ransomed. This may contribute to Emperor Gaozong's decision to not rescue Qinzong. The first siege of Bianjing ended after Qinzong gave a city to the Jurchens and paid them annual tribute. Emperor Huizong returned after hearing that the siege was over.

=== Causes of the Second Siege of Bianjing ===
Despite this, almost as soon as the Jin armies had left Kaifeng, Emperor Qinzong reneged on the deal and dispatched two armies to repel the Jurchen troops attacking Taiyuan and bolster the defenses of Zhongshan and Hejian. An army of 90,000 soldiers and another of 60,000 were defeated by Jin forces by June. A second expedition to rescue Taiyuan was also unsuccessful. Emperor Qinzong rejected a proposal to reinforce the northern borders reasoning that they may never come back and sent his generals to other parts of the country. The Jin imperial court sent two ambassadors to Song. The two ambassadors were nobles from the former Liao dynasty. Emperor Qinzong misjudged the situation and believed that they could be used to turn against the Jin ruler, Emperor Taizong. Emperor Qinzong sent a coded letter which was sealed in candle wax, inviting them to join Song to form an Anti–Jin alliance but the ambassadors handed the letter to Emperor Taizong and in retaliation, accused Emperor Qinzong for violating the peace treaty and sent an even bigger army against the Song.

== Capture ==
Since Qinzong mistakenly removed the army to post in different parts of the country, the Jin forces eventually breached the walls of the Song capital, Bianjing, in 1127 and occupied the city in an event historically known as the Jingkang Incident ("Jingkang" was the era name of Emperor Qinzong.) Emperor Qinzong, along with his father Emperor Huizong and the rest of their family, were taken prisoner by Jin forces, marking the end of the Northern Song. Qinzong's brother Zhao Gou managed to escape to southern China, where he reestablished the empire as the Southern Song dynasty and became historically known as Emperor Gaozong.

=== Life in the Jin Dynasty ===
Emperor Qinzong and his father were demoted to the status of commoners on 20 March 1127 and deported to Huining Prefecture, the Jin capital, on 13 May 1127. In 1128, the two former Song emperors were forced to wear mourning dresses and pay homage to the ancestors of the Jin Emperors at their ancestral temple in Huining Prefecture. Furthermore, the Jurchen ruler, Emperor Taizong, gave the two former Song emperors contemptuous titles to humiliate them: Emperor Qinzong was called "Marquis Chonghun" (重昏侯; literally "Doubly Muddle-headed Marquis") while Emperor Huizong was called "Duke Hunde" (昏德公; literally "Muddle-headed Duke").

In 1141, as the Jin Empire normalised relations with the (Southern) Song Empire, the Jurchens renamed Emperor Qinzong's title to the more neutral-sounding "Duke of Tianshui Commandery" (天水郡公), which is based on a commandery located in the upper reaches of the Wei River. A few months later, the former emperor started receiving a stipend due to his nobility status. He lived the rest of his life as a captive in the Jin Empire, which used him as a hostage to put pressure on the Song Empire.

In 1142, Emperor Gaozong signed the Treaty of Shaoxing which made peace with the Jin Dynasty. This destroyed Qinzong's chance of returning.

Emperor Qinzong died as a sick and broken man in 1156 having spent two-thirds of his life in the Jin Dynasty. He was 56. His temple name means "Venerate Ancestor". The cause of his death was a subject of debate, with some sources suggesting he died of illness. In Da Song Xuanhe Yishi (大宋宣和遗事), it was said that the Jin Emperor who at the time was the Prince of Hailing ordered him and the former Emperor Tianzuo of Liao to compete in a match of polo in an act of humiliation. Emperor Qinzong was weak and frail, thus quickly fell off the horse and trampled to death by the horses. However, the latter event is largely fictitious, as Da Song Xuanhe Yishi was a novel written during the Yuan dynasty.

In 1161, news of Emperor Qinzong's death reached Lin'an, and Emperor Gaozong of Song held a funeral. After Emperor Qinzong's death, Emperor Gaozong had no more worries, and thus abdicated the throne to Emperor Xiaozong of Song the following year.

== Family ==
- Empress Renhuai, of the Zhu clan (仁懷皇后 朱氏; 1102–1127)
  - Zhao Chen, Crown Prince (皇太子 趙諶; 1117–1128), first son
  - Princess Roujia (柔嘉公主; b. 1121), first daughter
- Virtuous Consort Shen, of the Zhu clan (慎德妃 朱氏; 1110–1142)
  - Zhao Jin (趙謹; b. 1127), second son
  - Third daughter (b. 1130)
- Cairen, of the Zheng clan (才人 鄭氏), personal name Qingyun (慶雲)
  - Zhao Xun (趙訓; b. 1129), fourth son
- Cairen, of the Han clan (才人 韓氏), personal name Jingguan (靜觀)
  - Third son (b. 1128)
- Cairen, of the Di clan (才人 狄氏; b. 1114), personal name Yuhui (玉輝)
  - Second daughter (b. 1129)

== See also ==
- Family tree of Chinese monarchs (453–1279)
- List of emperors of the Song dynasty
- Architecture of the Song dynasty
- Culture of the Song dynasty
- Economy of the Song dynasty
- History of the Song dynasty
- Society of the Song dynasty
- Science and technology of the Song dynasty
- Jin–Song wars

Emperor Qinzong House of Zhao Born: May 23 1100 Died: June 14 1156
Regnal titles
Preceded by Emperor Huizong	Emperor of the Song dynasty 1126–1127	Succeeded by Emperor Gaozong
