= Secretariat-Chancellery =

Government department that used to exist in China and Korea

Chinese name
- Traditional Chinese: 中書門下省
- Simplified Chinese: 中书门下省
Transcriptions
Standard Mandarin
- Hanyu Pinyin: Zhōngshū Ménxià Shěng
- Wade–Giles: Chung^{1}-shu^{1} Men^{2}-hsia^{4} Sheng^{3}

Alternative Chinese name
- Chinese: 两省
- Literal meaning: Two Departments
Transcriptions
Standard Mandarin
- Hanyu Pinyin: Liǎng Shěng

Korean name
- Hangul: 중서문하성
- Hanja: 中書門下省
Transcriptions
- Revised Romanization: Jungseo Munha Seong
- McCune–Reischauer: Chungsŏ Munha Sŏng

Secretariat-Chancellery was a central government department in several dynasties in imperial China and Korea. It was created in the Tang dynasty by combining the Central Secretariat and the Chancellery. It was a particularly important office in late Tang, the Song dynasty, and Goryeo.
