= Empress Xiang =

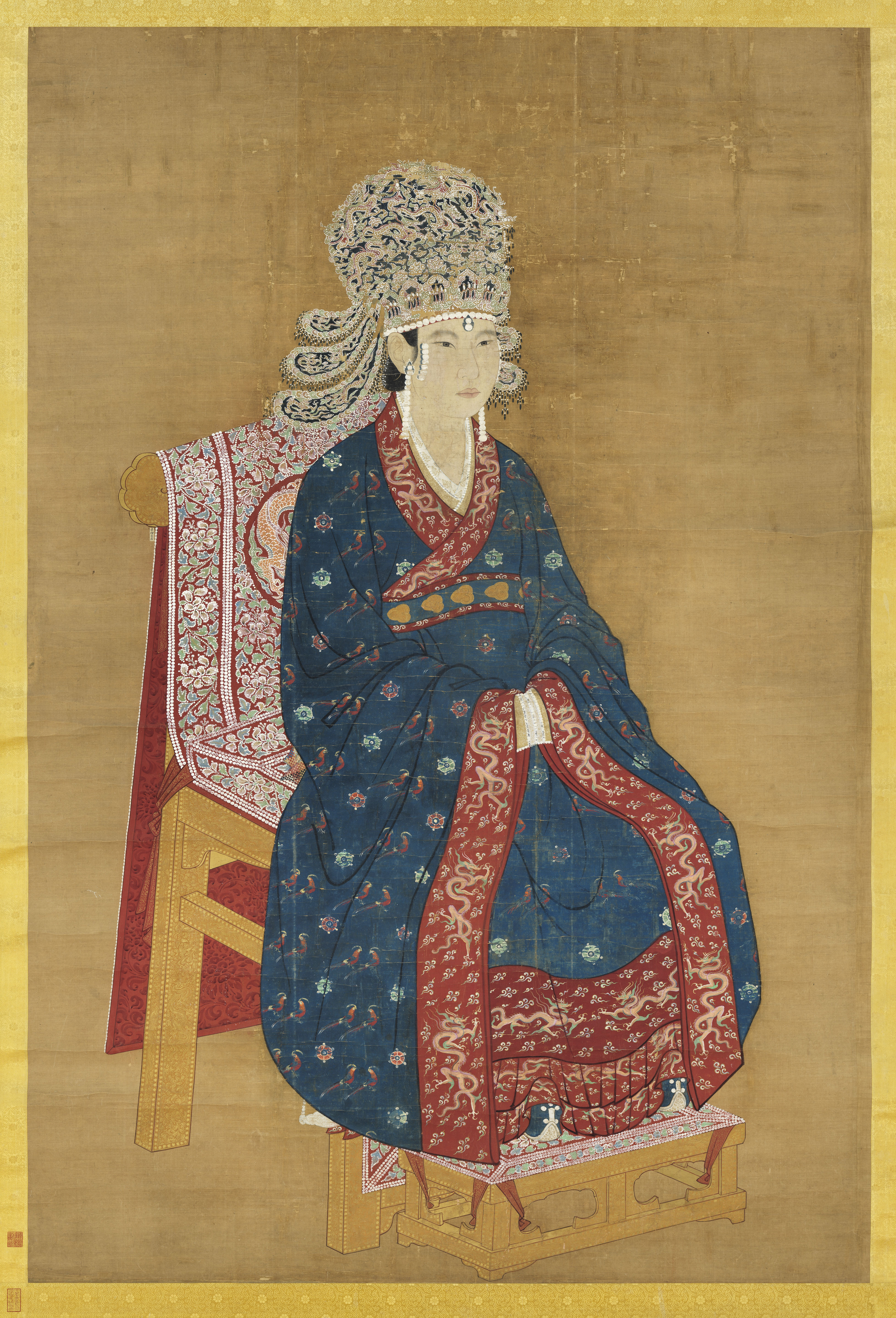
Empress Xiang

Empress Xiang (欽聖皇后; 1047–1102) was a Chinese empress consort of the Song Dynasty, married to Emperor Shenzong of Song. She acted as co-regent of China during the reign of her adopted son, Emperor Huizong of Song, in 1100.

== Life ==
=== Empress consort ===
Empress Xiang was elevated to the rank of Empress to Emperor Shenzong in 1068. She had only one child, a daughter Shuhuai who was born in 1067, and died in 1078. However, as the empress, she was the legal mother of the emperor's heir and successor, the future Emperor Zhezong of Song, born to Consort Zhu. She was also the legal mother of the future Emperor Huizong of Song, son of Consort Chen (d. 1085).

=== Reign of Emperor Zhezong ===
In 1085, her stepson and adoptive son, Emperor Zhezong of Song, succeeded to the throne, until 1093 under the regency of her mother-in-law, Empress Dowager Gao. During the reign of Zhezong, Xiang was ceremoniously honoured as the legal mother of the Emperor. Reportedly, she had a long dislike toward the biological mother of the Emperor, Consort Dowager Zhu (1051 — 1102).

She had a good relationship with her first daughter-in-law, Empress Meng, whom she considered educated in both literature and wifely manners, and she disapproved when Emperor Zhezong deposed Meng from the position of Empress after a witch trial in 1096. She later claimed, that the edict deposing the empress, which had been issued in her name as empress dowager, had been forged and that she had not even seen it.

In 1099, she and Consort Dowager Zhu selected the brides and concubines of the emperor's brothers, prince Bi and prince Huizong. In 27 December 1100, Consort Liu was elevated to the position of empress, which was not approved by Xiang. When the Emperor died in 1100, the succession was not clear, and Empress Xiang called upon the officials of state, and selected the next heir to the throne.

=== Reign of Emperor Huizong: regency ===
When her younger adoptive son, Emperor Huizong of Song, succeeded his brother on the throne at the age of seventeen in 1100, he expressed a wish to the Council of State that his mother was to act as his regent. Because he was seventeen years old and therefore no longer regarded as a minor, his wish caused some debate among the ministers as to how this could be arranged, and to find a precedence case to legitimatize it. On two occasions, an Empress Dowager had ruled during the minority of an Emperor: in the case of Emperor Renzong of Song, and in the case of Emperor Zhezong of Song, during which the child Emperor and Empress Dowager regent both sat together behind a screen in the audience chamber when the Council of State spoke to them, and the birthday of the Empress Dowager was ritually celebrated as that of the ruler and she was declared as such to the Liao state by diplomats. A different precedence was that of Emperor Yingzong of Song, who had not been a minor, but were the Empress Dowager Cao had been regent during his illness, during which the Council of State had formally called first at the Emperor, but then visited the audience hall of the Empress Dowager, repeated their subject and then adjusted to her words: in that case, the Empress Dowager regent had not been ritually treated as the ruler, and the measure was treated as temporary. Zeng Bu of the Council of State concluded that the latter arrangements were more appropriate in the case of the co-regency of Empress Xiang: he informed the Emperor, and they continued to inform Empress Xiang. She assured the Council that she had not been behind the wish to co-rule with her son, and that she accepted to be regent on the same terms as the Empress Cao. It was decided, that she would not appear in the Imperial audience chamber, nor would she be ritually celebrated as a ruler or referred to as such in the diplomatic reports; but that the Council of State would visit her in the Inner Eastern Gate every time they had visited the Emperor, and give her the same report of the affairs of state.

During her co-reign, Empress Xiang was active foremost within palace affairs. She gave audiences and conferred with the government, expressed concerns that she was not suitable because she had difficulty in reading. She wrote a statement, in which she promised to step down from her position as soon as the funeral rituals of her late spouse was completed. She reported suspicions to Zeng Bu that she suspected the biological mother of Emperor Zhezong, Consort Zhu, of at least two plots for placing her other son, Prince Si, on the throne. Xiang also used her power as co-regent to push her view, that Emperor Zhezong had done wrong by demoting Empress Meng in favor of Empress Liu. She declared, that the demotion had been forged, and that Meng should be given back the states of Empress, while Liu should be stripped from hers. This led to a conflict with the council, who argued that an emperor could not change the status of his late brother's widow. The affairs ended with a compromise: on 23 June 1100, Xiang succeeded with having the status of empress returned to Meng, but was prevented from stripping Liu of her title, resulting in Emperor Zhezong having two Empresses Dowager. The affair, however, also resulted in concern in the Council of State that the influence of Xiang was in danger of becoming to great, and that a rivaling power fraction could form around her. When the son of Emperor Huizong of Song had been born, the Council of State therefore pointed out to the emperor, that as he was now the father of a son, he was no longer in need of a co-regent. Xiang has been portrayed as a conservative: however, she successfully prevented the attempts to remove reformist Cai Jing from government.

Empress Dowager Xiang stepped down from co-regency on 1 June 1100.

== Notes ==
Chinese royalty
| Preceded by Empress Gao (Song dynasty) | Empress of China; 1068–1085 | Succeeded by Empress Meng |
