= Emperor Zhezong =

Emperor of Song China from 1085 to 1100

Emperor Zhezong of Song 宋哲宗
- Palace portrait on a hanging scroll, kept in the National Palace Museum, Taipei, Taiwan

Emperor of the Song dynasty
- Reign: 1 April 1085 – 23 February 1100
- Coronation: 1 April 1085
- Predecessor: Emperor Shenzong
- Successor: Emperor Huizong
- Born: Zhao Yong (1077–1085); Zhao Xu (1085–1100) (Note: Had his name changed to "Zhao Xu" in March 1085 when he was officially designated as the Crown Prince. This name became his official personal name when he ascended the throne five days later.); 4 January 1077
- Died: 23 February 1100 (aged 23); Kaifeng, Henan, Song China
- Burial: Yongtai Mausoleum (永泰陵, in present-day Gongyi, Henan)
- Consorts: Empress Zhaoci (m. 1088; dep. 1096) Empress Zhaohuai (before 1100)
- Issue: Princess Shuhe; Princess Shushen
Era dates
- Yuanyou (元祐; 1086–1094); Shaosheng (紹聖; 1094–1098); Yuanfu (元符; 1098–1100)
Posthumous name
- Emperor Xianyuan Jidao Shide Yanggong Qinwen Ruiwu Qisheng Zhaoxiao (憲元繼道世德揚功欽文睿武齊聖昭孝皇帝) (conferred in 1113)
Temple name
- Zhezong (哲宗)
- House: Zhao
- Dynasty: Song (Northern Song)
- Father: Emperor Shenzong
- Mother: Empress Qincheng

Emperor Zhezong of Song
- Chinese: 宋哲宗
- Literal meaning: "Wise Ancestor of the Song"
Transcriptions
Standard Mandarin
- Hanyu Pinyin: Sòng Zhézōng

Zhao Xu
- Traditional Chinese: 趙煦
- Simplified Chinese: 赵煦
Transcriptions
Standard Mandarin
- Hanyu Pinyin: Zhào Xù

Zhao Yong
- Traditional Chinese: 趙傭
- Simplified Chinese: 赵傭
Transcriptions
Standard Mandarin
- Hanyu Pinyin: Zhào Yōng

Emperor Zhezong of Song (4 January 1077 – 23 February 1100), personal name Zhao Xu, was the seventh emperor of the Song dynasty of China. His original personal name was Zhao Yong but he changed it to "Zhao Xu" after his coronation. He reigned from 1085 until his death in 1100, and was succeeded by his younger half-brother, Emperor Huizong, because his son died prematurely.

Emperor Zhezong was the sixth son of Emperor Shenzong. He ascended the throne at the age of nine under the supervision of his grandmother, Grand Empress Dowager Gao.

== Reign ==
Emperor Zhezong lowered taxes, stopped negotiations with the Tangut-led Western Xia state, and resumed armed conflict which eventually forced Western Xia to enter a more peaceful stance with the Song Empire. However, Emperor Zhezong was unable to stop fighting between conservative members of his government and the more liberal members who supported Wang Anshi's reforms and in fact, the fighting intensified during Emperor Zhezong's reign. This split would eventually contribute to the Northern Song dynasty's demise in the 12th century.

== Yuanyou era (1086-1093) ==
=== Empress Gao's regency ===
Empress Gao may have engineered 8-year-old Zhezong's enthronement to make herself regent. As regent, Empress Dowager Gao appointed conservatives such as Sima Guang as Chancellor, who halted the New Policies set forth by Wang Anshi before dying in 1086. The conservatives achieved some success in reversing the reforms.

Emperor Zhezong was powerless and it was not until Grand Empress Dowager Gao's death in 1093 that the emperor was able to reinstate Wang Anshi's reforms and reduce the late Sima Guang's influence. By then, factionalism was a greater concern than the practicality of the reforms themselves; both the conservatives and the reformists engaged in infighting.

Cheng Yi, a founder of Neo-confucianism and one of Zhezong's tutors, proposed that Li (principle) was an innate property that could provide moral guidance.

== Shaosheng era (1094-1098) ==
In 1094, Zhezong changed the era name to Shaosheng (紹聖), meaning "continuing sagacity", to signify the continuation of Shenzong's reforms (partly due to Zhezong's sense of filial piety). He promptly named the reformist Zhang Dun as grand chancellor. The ensuing policy and personnel debates sharply polarized the bureaucracy. Zhang Dun systematically purged the conservatives and silenced dissent while maintaining a relatively pragmatic revival of the New Policies. The reformists took revenge for the earlier exile of their fellow partisan Cai Que to Lingnan by using the Korean Affairs Institute to exile many conservatives to the same area. Meanwhile, a blacklist of 37 conservatives barred them and their descendants from serving in the government.

=== Personal philosophy ===
Zhezong's modifications to the imperial examinations required candidates to support a reformist stance. He argued that Empress Gao's conservative restoration (which had repealed many of the New Policies) harmed the people and the government. Zhezong preferred the sages of antiquity (such as Yao and Shun) and rejected the Han dynasty and Tang dynasty models of governance.

=== War against the Western Xia ===
During the renewed war against the Western Xia, the Song military consolidated borders, constructed fortifications, and slowly took territory from the Xia. This successful strategy expanded the Song dynasty to its greatest territorial extent.

== Yuanfu era (1098-1100) ==
On May 18, 1099, Zhezong became ill in which the symptoms were constant coughing and constipation. Zhezong did not get any better, even though he had taken many medications and so Zhezong asked his councilors to recommend physicians. Geng Yu, a physician, advised Zhezong and even though Zhezong followed his directions, there were no signs of him getting better.

In July, his constipation was replaced by severe diarrhea and Zhezong could not get up from his bed to receive medicine. Geng recommended spleen-warming pills, an action Zhezong's mother supported.

The coolness of the weather improved Zhezong's health; making him well enough to attend the celebration of his son Zhao Mao on August 8. But his illness returned so Zhezong cancelled his audiences for two days. When he saw his councillors on August 14, he told them that Geng gave him medicine to induce vomiting. He was slightly better but his appetite was gone and his belly constantly ached. Zhezong attended the banquet in honor of his son, in which he was in a very good mood and that his younger brother Zhao Ji also attended. However, Zhao Mao became sick. Zhezong, now in a bad mood due to his son's illness told his councillors that the royal doctors were treating Zhao Mao. On September 26, Zhao Mao was getting better but soon died making Zhezong cancelling his audiences for three days. His birthday was a great celebration but was cut short when after the birthday party, he fell ill and was vomiting all day long. He also contracted laryngitis and could only speak with great effort. By December 21, Zhezong was close to death; he had a weak pulse.

Emperor Zhezong died on February 23, 1100, in Kaifeng at the age of 23 and was succeeded by his younger brother, Emperor Huizong. Huizong's mother, Empress Xiang, led a conservative restoration in court.

== Family ==
- Empress Zhaoci, of the Meng clan (昭慈皇后 孟氏; 1073–1131)
  - Princess Xunmei (洵美帝姬; 1094–1096), first daughter
- Empress Zhaohuai, of the Liu clan (昭懷皇后 劉氏; 1078–1113), personal name Qingjing (清菁)
  - Princess Shushen (淑慎帝姬; 1096–1164), third daughter
    - Married Pan Zhengfu (潘正夫; d. 1153) in 1112, and had issue (three sons)
  - Princess Chunmei (純美帝姬; 1097–1099), fourth daughter
  - Zhao Mao, Crown Prince Xianmin (獻愍皇太子 趙茂; 1099), first son
- Jieyu, of the Zhang clan (张婕妤)
- Jieyu, of the Hu clan (胡婕妤)
- Beauty, of the Han clan (韓美人)
- Unknown
  - Princess Shuhe (淑和帝姬; d. 1117), second daughter
    - Married Shi Duanli (石端禮) in 1110

== See also ==
- Chinese emperors family tree (middle)
- List of emperors of the Song dynasty
- Architecture of the Song dynasty
- Culture of the Song dynasty
- Economy of the Song dynasty
- History of the Song dynasty
- Society of the Song dynasty
- Technology of the Song dynasty
- Wang Anshi
- Sima Guang

Emperor Zhezong House of Zhao Born: 4 January 1077 Died: 23 February 1100[aged 23]
Regnal titles
Preceded by Emperor Shenzong	Emperor of the Song Dynasty; 1085–1100	Succeeded by Emperor Huizong
