= Emperor Gaozong of Song =

Emperor of China from 1127 to 1162

Emperor Gaozong of Song 宋高宗
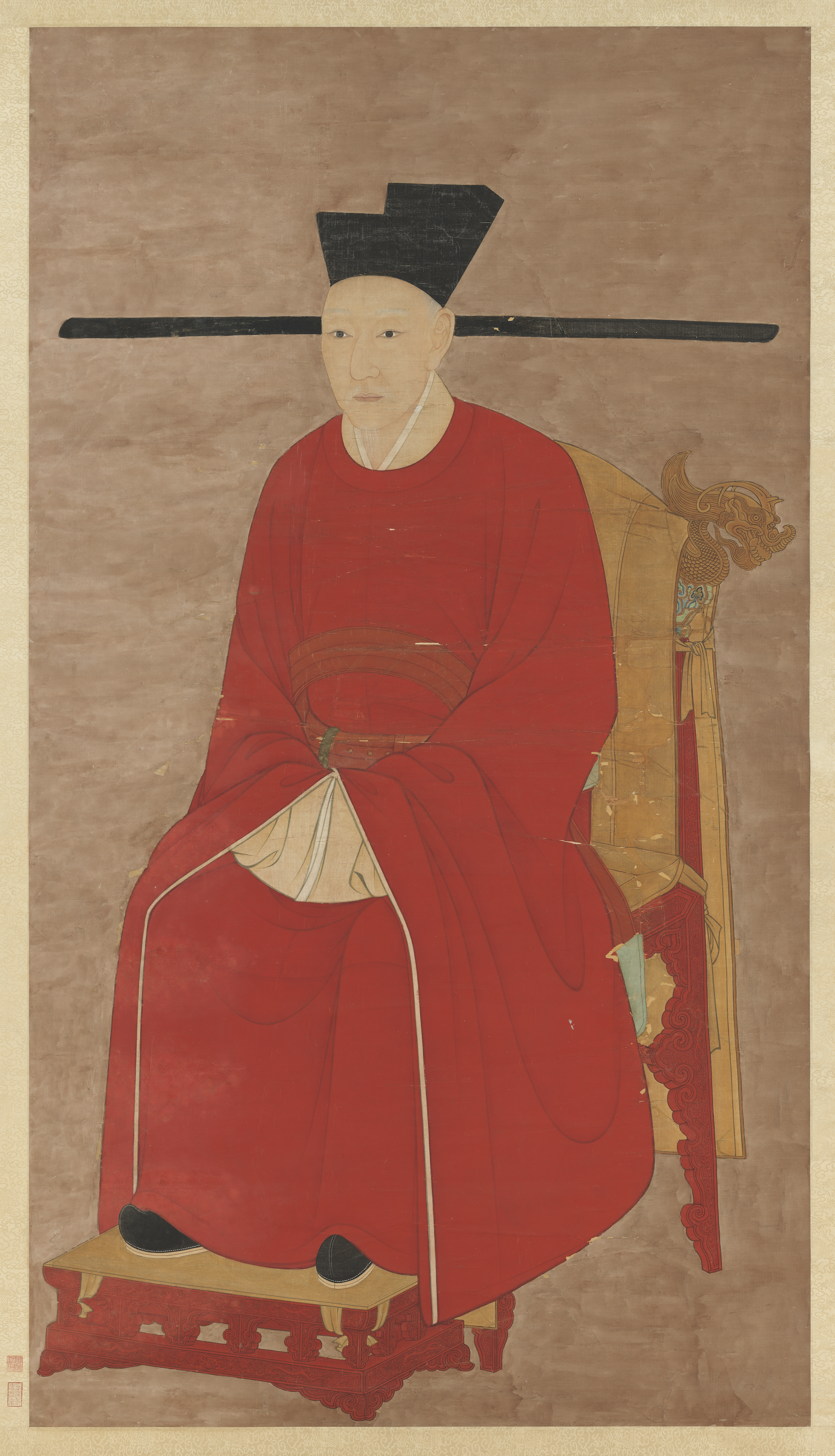
- Palace portrait on a hanging scroll – National Palace Museum, Taipei

Emperor of the Song dynasty
- Reign: 12 June 1127 – 24 March 1129
- Coronation: 12 June 1127
- Predecessor: Emperor Qinzong
- Successor: Zhao Fu
- Reign: 20 April 1129 – 24 July 1162
- Predecessor: Zhao Fu
- Successor: Emperor Xiaozong

Retired Emperor of the Song dynasty
- Reign: 24 July 1162 – 9 November 1187
- Born: 12 June 1107; Bianliang (modern Kaifeng, Henan)
- Died: 9 November 1187 (aged 80); Lin'an (modern Hangzhou, Zhejiang)
- Burial: Yongsi Mausoleum (永思陵; modern Shaoxing, Zhejiang)
- Consorts: Empress Xianjie (died 1139) Empress Xiansheng (before 1187)
- Issue Detail: Zhao Fu
Era dates
- Jianyan (建炎; 1127–1130); Shaoxing (紹興; 1131–1162)
Posthumous name
- Emperor Shouming Zhongxing Quangong Zhide Shengshen Wuwen Zhaoren Xianxiao (受命中興全功至德聖神武文昭仁憲孝皇帝; conferred in 1191)
Temple name
- Gaozong (高宗)
- House: Zhao
- Father: Emperor Huizong
- Mother: Empress Xianren

Emperor Gaozong of Song
- Chinese: 宋高宗
Transcriptions
Standard Mandarin
- Hanyu Pinyin: Sòng Gāozōng

Birth name
- Traditional Chinese: 趙構
- Simplified Chinese: 赵构
Transcriptions
Standard Mandarin
- Hanyu Pinyin: Zhào Gòu

Courtesy name
- Chinese: 德基
Transcriptions
Standard Mandarin
- Hanyu Pinyin: Déjī

Emperor Gaozong of Song (12 June 1107 – 9 November 1187), personal name Zhao Gou, courtesy name Deji, was the tenth emperor of the Chinese Song dynasty and the first of the Southern Song dynasty, ruling between 1127 and 1162 and retaining power as retired emperor from 1162 until his death in 1187. The ninth son of Emperor Huizong and a younger half-brother of Emperor Qinzong, Zhao Gou was not present in the capital of Bianjing (the modern day Kaifeng) when it fell to the Jurchen-led Jin dynasty in 1127 during the beginning of the Jin-Song Wars. Narrowly avoiding capture by Jin forces, he escaped first to Yangzhou and then Lin'an (the modern day Hangzhou), assuming the throne and re-establishing the Song court. Despite initial setbacks, including Jin invasions and a brief deposition in 1129, Emperor Gaozong consolidated his political position and presided over the continued military conflict with Jin. Prior to 1141, military commanders including Han Shizhong and Yue Fei reconquered portions of the Central Plains while chancellors like Lü Yihao, Zhao Ding, Zhang Jun, and Qin Hui managed the civil bureaucracy.

In 1141, Gaozong collaborated with Qin to pursue a peace settlement with Jin. Although the resulting Treaty of Shaoxing ceded the Central Plains and formally established Song as a Jin tributary, it ensured two decades of uninterrupted peace, allowing the Southern Song state to achieve internal stability and open a lucrative trade with Jin. Furthermore, it served to preclude the return of Emperor Qinzong, who remained in captivity in Jin and whose release could have jeopardized Gaozong's claim to the throne. Gaozong and Qin then secured court control over the military, forcing Han Shizhong and the general Zhang Jun into retirement and executing Yue Fei on trumped-up charges. Despite his successes as emperor, Gaozong's treatment of Yue, who was remembered as a culture hero, and his surrender of over half of Song China to the enemy, marred his reputation in both traditional historiography and popular memory. Gaozong, along his father and half-brother, were blamed for the Song dynasty's decline.

Gaozong's only biological son, Zhao Fu, died in childhood. In 1160, he adopted his distant relative Zhao Yuan and elevated him to crown prince in 1162, shortly before abdicating in his favor. Despite his abdication, Gaozong retained de facto control of state affairs as retired emperor, continuing to oversee the dynasty until dying of natural causes in 1187, at the age of 80.

== Early life ==
Emperor Gaozong was the ninth son of Emperor Huizong and a younger half-brother of Emperor Qinzong. His mother, whose maiden family name was Wei (韋), was a concubine of Huizong. She was honoured as Empress Xianren (顯仁皇后; 1080–1159) after his ascension to the throne.

Emperor Gaozong was originally a prince named Zhao Gou during the reigns of his father and brother. After Huizong abdicated, his older brother Qinzong became emperor. During this time, the capital of Bianjing was under siege by the Jurchens. He was ordered to the Jurchen camp to negotiate peace by Qinzong in an effort to end the siege early but Zhao Gou was held for ransom. He later came back after being ransomed due to the Jurchens' doubts of his identity. After his half-brother and father and the capital were captured by forces of the Jurchen-led Jin Empire in the Jingkang Incident in 1127 along with majority of the imperial clan members due to his predecessors' incompetence and the imperial court's corruption, he escaped to Southern China due to being in Cizhou for a diplomatic mission and therefore, not in Bianjing. In order to escape, Zhao Gou had to move province to province in order to escape the Jin troops. The Jurchens tried to lure him back to Bianjing where they could finally capture him, but did not succeed. Zhao Gou finally arrived in the Song Southern Capital at Jiankang, the first of many temporary capitals.

== Reign ==
=== Enthronement ===
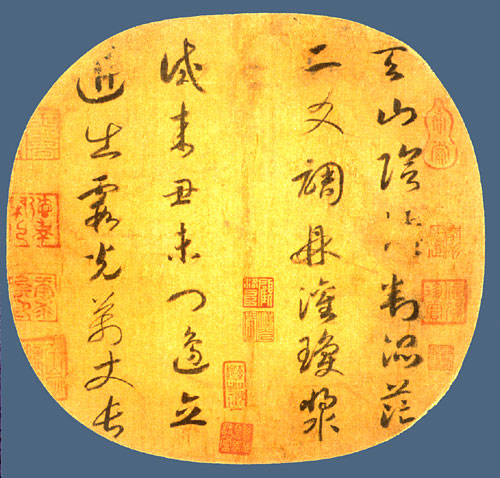
Quatrain on the Heavenly Mountain, calligraphy by Emperor Gaozong.

After proving himself to be a more competent administrator than his predecessors, he won support from imperial court's remnants of his ascension to the throne; he reestablished the Song Empire (historically known as the Southern Song dynasty) and was proclaimed as Emperor Gaozong with the era name Jianyan in Jiankang (present Nanjing) which at the time was a temporary residence for the remnants of the Song. The new reign name Jianyan 建炎, literally meaning "Establishing the Fire," suggests the Southern Song's continuation to the Northern Song (Fire was the dynastic element of the Song as decided in the early years of the dynasty). He would later move to Yingtianfu (應天府; modern Shangqiu) due to the historical significance to Emperor Taizu of Song.

From 1127 to 1129, the Song sent thirteen embassies to the Jin to discuss peace terms and to negotiate the release of Gaozong's mother and Huizong, but the Jin court ignored them. The Da Chu, a puppet state established by the Jin Empire, was abolished in 1127 when Zhang Bangchang and the regent of Da Chu, the former Empress Meng, submitted to Emperor Gaozong, who then ordered Zhang's execution under pressure from Li Gang.

Emperor Gaozong's early reign was filled with Jurchen raids and attacks on his realm. This can be traced to Zhang's execution and the submission of Da Chu to Song, which ultimately caused the Jin to renew their attacks and quickly conquer Northern China. Initially, he employed military leaders such as Li Gang, Zong Ze, Yue Fei, Han Shizhong, and Yu Yunwen to lead the Song forces to hold off the Jurchens, as well as to improve his public image through his declaration to restore the Song Empire to its former glory. However, when one of Li Gang's guerrilla forces, the Red Scarf Army, scored a major victory against the Jin troops and almost captured their commander-in-chief, the emperor dismissed the minister on a trumped-up charge, implying that he did not want to win this battle, because if Song won, Emperor Qinzong might be restored.

Owing to the vulnerability of Yingtianfu, Emperor Gaozong moved to Yangzhou in late 1127 or early 1128. However, Yangzhou proved to be no safe haven for the Song either, as barely a year later the Jurchens advanced to the point where they were threatening to capture Yangzhou. When the Jurchens advanced to the Huai River, the court was partially evacuated to Lin'an (modern Hangzhou) in 1129. Days later, Gaozong narrowly escaped on horseback, just a few hours ahead of Jurchen vanguard troops.

=== Mutiny and first abdication ===
Seated portrait of Emperor Gaozong.

On March 26, 1129, Gaozong lost his throne to a mutiny that was instigated by the palace guards led by Miao Fu (苗傅) and Liu Zhengyan (劉正彥). They were unsatisfied with Gaozong's decision to appoint their adversary Wang Yuan to an important imperial post hence would outrank them. Banding together with at least ten thousand palace guards under the pretense that Wang and the court eunuchs were plotting, Miao and Liu mutinied and murdered Wang. They then forced Gaozong to abdicate in favor of his two-year-old son, Zhao Fu. The plot came to an abrupt end less than a month later on April 20, 1129, when Miao and Liu were defeated by Gaozong's loyal army, led by Han Shizhong, and were both executed for treason. Gaozong's son later died from illness after an unofficial reign of three months. After being restored to the throne, Gaozong himself was pursued by Jin forces and was not in full control of southern China until the late 1130s. The mutiny would cause Emperor Gaozong to move his capital to Jiankang.

In 1130, Wuzhu, a Jurchen general, crossed the Yangtze southwest of Jiankang and then captured the city. Wuzhu set out from Jiankang and advanced rapidly to try to capture Gaozong. The Jin seized Hangzhou on January 22 and then Shaoxing further south on February 4 where Emperor Gaozong was almost captured by Wuzhu at Mingzhou near Lin'an but Zhang Jun, another general who briefly halted the Jin advance, giving Emperor Gaozong the chance to flee the city by ship. Soon, the Jurchens gave up the pursuit and retreated north. After they plundered the undefended cities of Hangzhou and Suzhou, they finally started to face resistance from Song armies led by Yue Fei and Han Shizhong.

In 1130, during the Battle of Huangtiandang, when fleeing to the south, he had the newly appointed commander-in-chief, Yue Fei, who was only 27 years old at the time, to help with the defense, and Yue scored a major victory against the Jin armies neared Nanjing. After the Song forces defeated the Jin, they stayed north of the Yangzi River, and Emperor Gaozong declared the city of Lin'an as the dynasty's new temporary capital, replacing Kaifeng in 1133.

Having no surviving sons of his own, he adopted two boys in 1133: one of them became the foster son of the future Empress Wu in 1140, and the other one in 1142.

=== Invasion of Da Qi ===
Reluctant to let the war drag on, the Jin decided to create Da Qi (the "Great Qi") in 1130, their second attempt at a puppet state in Northern China. The Jurchens believed that this state, nominally ruled by someone of Han Chinese descent, would be able to attract the allegiance of disaffected members of the insurgency. The Jurchens also suffered from a shortage of skilled manpower, and controlling the entirety of northern China was not administratively feasible. In the final months of 1129, Liu Yu (劉豫; 1073–1143) won the favor of the Jin Emperor Taizong. Da Qi had more autonomy than the previous Da Chu although Liu Yu was obligated to obey the orders of the Jurchen generals. With Jin support, Da Qi invaded the Song in November 1133. Li Cheng, a Song turncoat who had joined the Qi, led the campaign. They initially had success as Xiangyang and nearby prefectures fell to his army. The capture of Xiangyang on the Han River gave the Jurchens a passage into the central valley of the Yangtze River. However, their southward push was halted by the general Yue Fei. In 1134, Yue Fei defeated Li and retook Xiangyang and its surrounding prefectures. But later that year, Qi and Jin initiated a new offensive further east along the Huai River. For the first time, Emperor Gaozong issued an edict officially condemning Da Qi. The armies of Qi and Jin won a series of victories in the Huai Valley, but were repelled by Han Shizhong near Yangzhou and by Yue Fei at Luzhou (廬州, modern Hefei). In 1135, the Jin Emperor Taizong died. This caused the Da Qi to suddenly withdraw, giving the Song time to regroup. The Da Qi lost a battle at Outang (藕塘), in modern Anhui, against a Song army led by Yang Qizhong (楊沂中). The victory boosted Song morale, and the military commissioner Zhang Jun convinced Emperor Gaozong to begin plans for a counterattack. Emperor Gaozong initially agreed, but he quickly abandoned the counteroffensive when an officer named Li Qiong (酈瓊) killed his superior official and defected to the Jin with tens of thousands of soldiers.

=== Steps towards peace ===
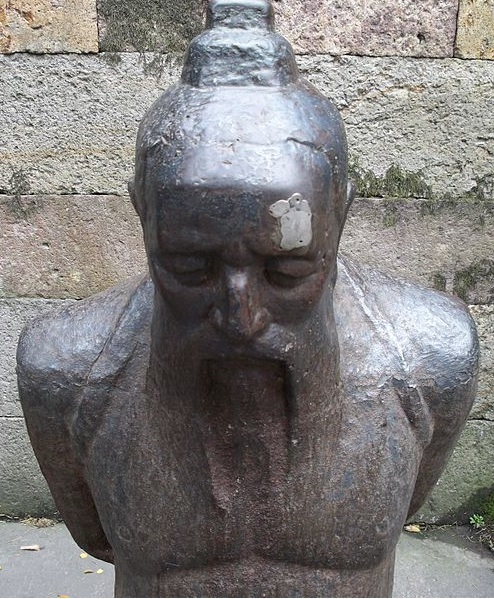
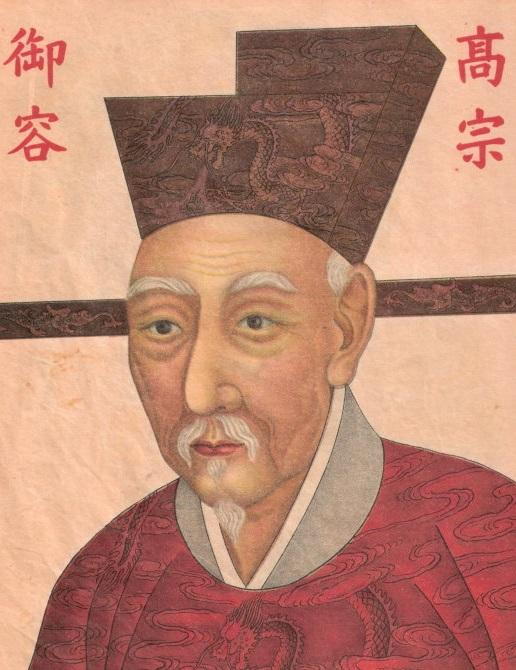
Chancellor Qin Hui (left) and Emperor Gaozong (right) all took steps to ratify peace.

Meanwhile, Emperor Xizong inherited the Jin throne from Taizong, and pushed for peace. He and his generals were disappointed with Liu Yu's military failures and believed that Liu was secretly conspiring with Yue Fei. These conditions caused the Jin to officially abolish Da Qi in late 1137 and the Jin and Song began negotiations towards peace.

When Emperor Gaozong was eventually told of the death of Huizong and Empress Zheng in 1137, he reportedly reacted quite severely, ordering an extended period of mourning.

In 1138, Gaozong officially declared Lin'an the capital of the dynasty, but the label of temporary capital would still be in place. Despite this, Lin'an would remain the capital of the Southern Song for the next 150 years, growing into a major commercial and cultural center.

Gaozong promoted Qin Hui in 1138 and put him in charge of deliberations with the Jin. Yue Fei, Han Shizhong, and a large number of officials at court criticized the peace overtures. Aided by his control of the Censorate, Qin purged his enemies and continued negotiations.

=== Treaty of Shaoxing ===
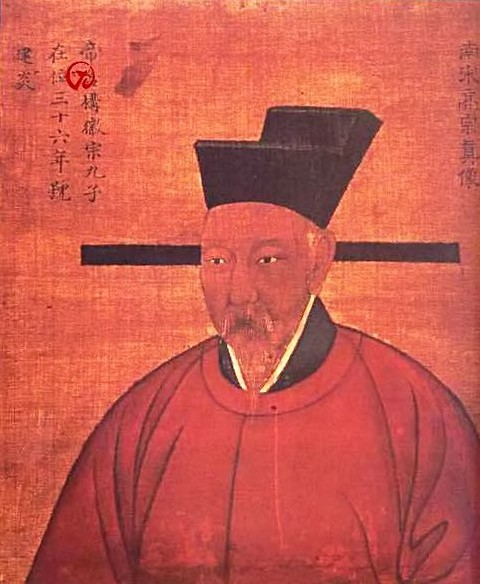
Left: Emperor Gaozong supported negotiating a peace treaty with the Jurchens, the Treaty of Shaoxing, ratified on October 11, 1142.

After years of fighting and significant military success, Emperor Gaozong settled on a pacifist stance. One of the major reasons behind this was that Emperor Gaozong and the chancellor Qin Hui did not want the Song army to defeat the Jurchens and destroy the Jin Dynasty, as this might result in Gaozong's half-brother – the last emperor of the Northern Song Dynasty, Emperor Qinzong, who was living in Jin-imposed exile in Manchuria – being recalled to the throne. If this happened, Gaozong would lose power. At the time, Yue Fei and Han Shizhong were preparing to attack Kaifeng and recapture it. Fearing that a victory at Kaifeng might cause the Jurchens to release Emperor Qinzong, Emperor Gaozong followed their advice, sending 12 orders back in the form of 12 gold plaques to Yue Fei, recalling him to the capital. There, Yue Fei said, in tears, "Thirty years of effort now is wasted." Emperor Gaozong also recalled every soldier under threats to kill their families. After Yue Fei's return to the capital, Emperor Gaozong and Qin Hui imprisoned him on a trumped-up charge under "groundless" (Chinese: 莫須有; pinyin: mò xū yǒu) and had him put to death. Han Shizhong was also dismissed from his military duties. On October 11, 1142, the Song and Jin empires signed the Treaty of Shaoxing, which recognised the Jurchens' claims to the former Song territories they had already conquered. This meant that Emperor Gaozong had to give up all land north of the Huai River, in exchange for peace between the two empires. Aside from two incidents, this peace would last for seventy years. The Song also had to pay a yearly tribute of 250,000 taels of silver and 250,000 packs of silk to the Jin.

The negotiation allowed the emperor's mother and other selected members of the imperial clan (including a woman claimed to be his half-sister Princess Roufu (Zhao Duofu), whom he later sentenced to death under suspicion of impersonating an imperial princess) to return to Song; Empress Wei was then named Empress Dowager in Southern Song. However, the treaty designated the Song as the "insignificant state", while the Jin was recognized as the "superior state". People would later blame the emperor for Yue Fei's death and vilify him as a hypocritical tyrant who sought to solidify power at the expense of greater danger to Song. However, although the treaty's terms resulted in Song becoming a vassal state to the Jin, it saved Song's economy: since the dynasty's founding, the regime had lost more capital on military defenses than on annual payments to their neighbors, about three-quarters of state revenue. Thus, even if Gaozong wanted to recover the lost territories, he could not afford it financially; the cost of rebuilding the Song's northern territories would have risked bankrupting the south, rendering the pursuant for peace inevitable. In addition, with the southern part of China remaining under Song control, the transport of goods became more cost-effective by boat via the streams and camels criss-crossing the region. It also eliminated obstacles to trades, allowing traders to import goods between Song and Jin territories. Qin Hui, in a reply to Gaozong's gratitude for the success of the peace negotiations, told the emperor that "the decision to make peace was entirely Your Majesty's. Your servant only carried it out; what achievement was there in this for me?"

Emperor Gaozong was also a notable poet and had significant influence on other Chinese poets. Among his surviving works is the Quatrain on Heavenly Mountain.

In 1161, the ruler of the Jin Dynasty, Wanyan Liang, wishing to unify China under his regime, declared war on the Song in the Battle of Tangdao and the Battle of Caishi. The Jin lost the war. An important consequence of this was to remove Song's status as a vassal state, although it still had to pay tribute. Wanyan Liang was assassinated shortly afterwards, when many Jin officers rebelled as a result of the Jin defeat.

=== Economy under Emperor Gaozong ===
In the Shaoxing period, Emperor Gaozong told his ministers that expanding court land is similar to buying private land, questioning its value if it brings no benefits. During his reign, the government's economic role grew, with fiscal policy aiding political functions and regulating social economic activity.

During the early Shaoxing period of Emperor Gaozong, Hu Meng, Deputy Director of the Bureau of General Accounts, requested the court to issue an edict to promote tax collectors who exceeded their targets to raise military funds. The period also created the zongzhi tax which combined twenty taxes along with the continuance of Xuanhe period taxes by officials. These increases of taxes further funded the military.

== As Retired Emperor ==
In 1162, after reigning for more than 35 years, Emperor Gaozong abdicated. Because his only son, Zhao Fu, had died of illness around the age of two, Emperor Gaozong passed the throne to his adopted son and distant cousin Zhao Shen, who then became Emperor Xiaozong. Emperor Gaozong's handling of the Battle of Caishi with Wanyan Liang may also have contributed to his decision to retire. In retirement he assumed the title of Taishang Huang ("Retired Emperor") and retained some power until his death in 1187.

His death saddened Emperor Xiaozong and caused him to abdicate only two years after Gaozong's death.

=== Sister Song's Fish Soup ===
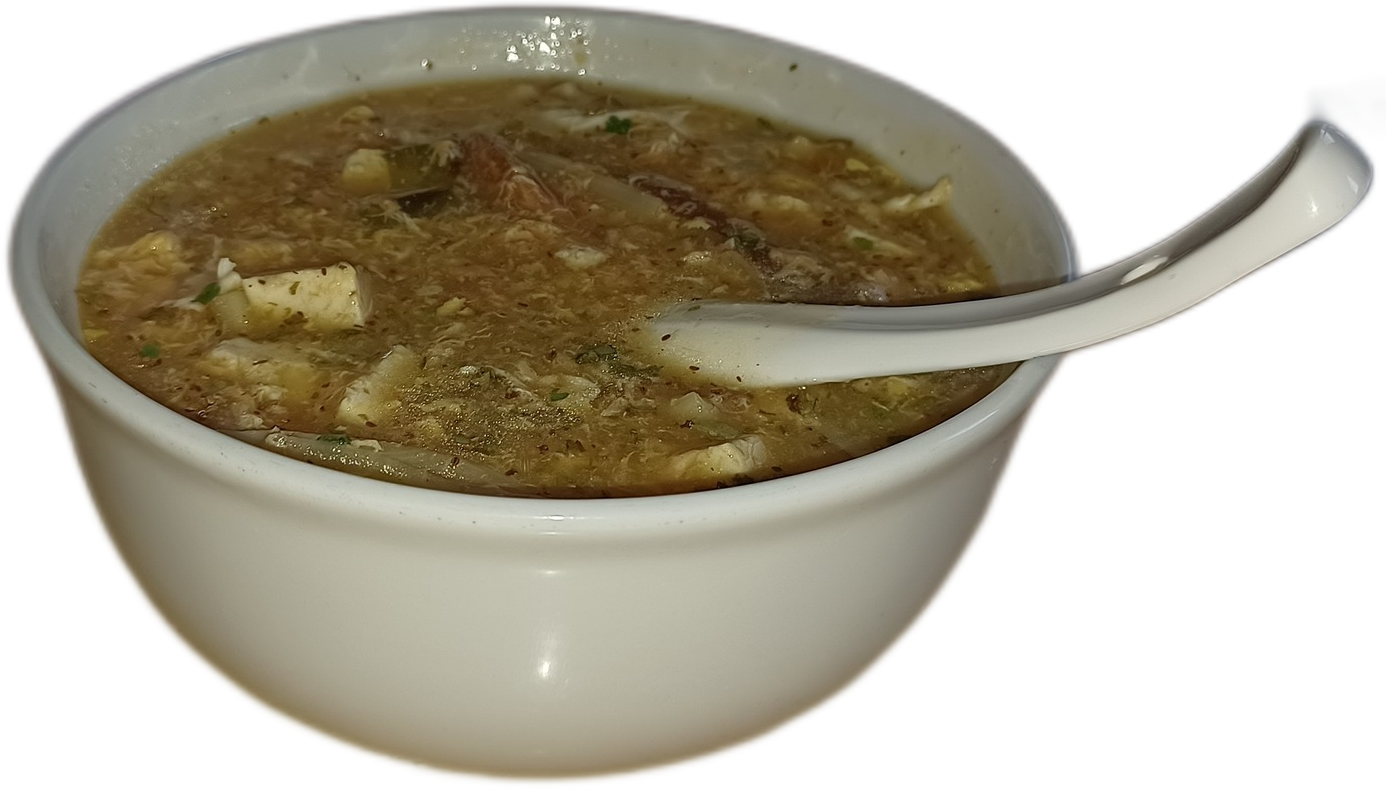
Sister Song's Fish Soup (宋嫂魚羹)

In 1180, Gaozong, when cruising on the West Lake, came across an elderly woman known as Fifth Sister Song, who escaped to Hangzhou after the Jurchens occupied the former capital and made her living by running a diner near the lake. After Gaozong tried one bowl from her, he offered her gold and silk after enjoying it. This event made her soup dish famous in the Southern Song capital; it then named Sister Song's Fish Soup (宋嫂魚羹) and she became a wealthy culinarian. It remains a traditional dish in the Zhejiang cuisine.

== Family ==
- Empress Xianjie, of the Xing clan (憲節皇后 邢氏; 1106–1139), personal name Bingyi (秉懿)
- Empress Xiansheng, of the Wu clan (憲聖皇后 吳氏; 1115–1197)
- Noble Consort, of the Zhang clan (張貴妃, d.1190)
- Worthy Consort, of the Zhang clan (張賢妃 張氏, d. 22 March 1147)
- Worthy Consort, of the Liu clan (劉賢妃 劉氏, d. 1187)
- Worthy Consort, of the Pan clan (賢妃 潘氏; d. 1148)
  - Zhao Fu, Crown Prince Yuanyi (元懿皇太子 趙旉; 1127–1129), first son
- Lady of Graceful Ceremony, of the Liu clan (劉婉儀 劉氏)
- Beauty, of the Feng clan (美人 冯氏)
- Unknown
  - First Princess Kang (康大宗姬; 1124–1127), personal name Fuyou (佛佑), first daughter
  - Second Princess Kang (康二宗姬; b. 1124), personal name Shenyou (神佑), second daughter
  - Third Princess Kang (康三宗姬; b. 1125)
  - Fourth Princess Kang (康四宗姬; b. 1126)
  - Fifth Princess Kang (康五宗姬; b. 1126)

== See also ==
1. Chinese emperors family tree (middle)
2. List of emperors of the Song dynasty
3. Architecture of the Song dynasty
4. Culture of the Song dynasty
5. Economy of the Song dynasty
6. History of the Song dynasty
7. Society of the Song dynasty
8. Technology of the Song dynasty
9. Yue Fei
10. Jin–Song Wars
11. Tang Clan

Emperor Gaozong of Song House of Zhao Born: 12 June 1107 Died: 9 November 1187
Regnal titles
Preceded by Emperor Qinzong	Emperor of the Song Dynasty; 1127–1162	Succeeded by Emperor Xiaozong
Honorary titles
Vacant Title last held by Emperor Huizong	Retired Emperor of China; 1162–1187	Vacant Title next held by Emperor Xiaozong
