= Yandian =

Yandian may refer to the following locations in China:

- Yandian, Hubei (烟店镇), a town in Anlu, Xiaogan, Hubei
- Yandian, Linqing (烟店镇), a town in Shandong
- Yandian, Shen County (燕店镇), a town in Shandong
- Yandian, Yanzhou (颜店镇), a town in Shandong
- Yandian Township, Anhui (严店乡), in Feixi County
- Yandian Township, Liaoning (阎店乡), in Wafangdian
- Yandian, Wulipu (严店村), a village in Wulipu, Shayang, Jingmen, Hubei
- Yandian, Yandian (烟店村), a village in Yandian, Anlu, Xiaogan, Hubei
