= Zhang Chu =

Zhang Chu may refer to:

- Dazexiang uprising, which proclaimed the Zhang Chu kingdom
- Da Chu or Zhang Chu, puppet dynasty under Zhang Bangchang
- Zhang Chu (singer), Chinese singer
