= Chu (Zhang Bangchang) =

Short-lived Chinese dynasty in 1127

Great Chu 大楚
- 1127–1127
- Status: Puppet state of the Jin dynasty
- Capital: Jiankang, modern Nanjing
- Government: Monarchy
- Emperor
  - 1127: Zhang Bangchang
- History
  - Buffer state of Chu created by the Jin: 20 April 1127
  - Zhang submits to the Song emperor, Chu is abolished: 23 May 1127
Preceded by	Succeeded by
Northern Song dynasty	Southern Song dynasty
- Today part of: China

Chu
- Chinese: 大楚
- Literal meaning: Great Chu
Transcriptions
Standard Mandarin
- Hanyu Pinyin: Dà Chǔ
Middle Chinese
- Middle Chinese: /dai^{H} t͡ʃʰɨʌ^{X}/

Chu, officially the Great Chu, was a short-lived Chinese dynasty in 1127 ruled by Zhang Bangchang (1081–1127), a puppet emperor enthroned with the support of the Jurchen-led Jin dynasty. The dynasty was abolished scarcely a month after its formation.

By 1127, the Jin dynasty had conquered northern China in the Jin–Song wars and captured the Northern Song capital of Kaifeng in the Jingkang Incident, but they lacked the resources to administer the newly acquired territories. Instead of directly annexing it, they formed the buffer state of Chu in 1127. Zhang, a former prime minister of the Song dynasty, was installed emperor of the new dynasty. He refused to wear the formal clothing of the emperor outside of his encounters with Jin officials. The offer of enthronement was too attractive for Zhang to resist, but he had reservations about his new role. Jiankang, modern Nanjing, became the capital of Chu. The support of Empress Dowager Yuanyou, who was dismissed as Empress by her former spouse Emperor Zhezong, was enlisted to bolster the legitimacy of the puppet government.

Meanwhile, a Song prince had escaped the capture of Kaifeng. He was enthroned Emperor Gaozong. The dynasty ended when Zhang agreed to recognize Emperor Gaozong as the new ruler of the revived Southern Song. Zhang submitted to Gaozong, but was sentenced to death by being coerced into commit suicide. Gaozong ordered the execution under pressure from Li Gang, his chief councilor, who opposed diplomatic reconciliation with the Jin and wanted Zhang executed for collaborating with the Jurchen government.

The elimination of Zhang and the Chu buffer state infringed on the treaty that the Jin and Song had negotiated. The Jin then recommenced their war with the Song. The invasion was hampered by the ongoing insurgency by Song loyalists in northern China.
