= Bofan =

Bofan 孛畈镇
- Town
- Location in Hubei
- Coordinates: 31°23′17″N 113°31′37″E
- Country: People's Republic of China
- Province: Hubei
- Prefecture-level city: Xiaogan
- County-level city: Anlu
- Village-level divisions: 3 communities, 14 villages

Area
  - Total: 116 km^{2} (45 sq mi)
- Elevation: 68 m (223 ft)

Population (2010)
  - Total: 24,765
  - Density: 213/km^{2} (553/sq mi)
- Time zone: UTC+8 (China Standard)

Bofan (Chinese: 孛畈; pinyin: Bófàn) (also Beifan Town) is a town in northeastern Hubei province, China, located just north of G70 Fuzhou–Yinchuan Expressway and under the administration of Anlu City, the centre of which lies 21 kilometres (13 mi) to the southeast.

== Administrative divisions ==
The town is made up of 3 subdistricts and 14 villages including Bofan Community (孛畈社区) and Sanli Community (三里社区).

As of 2011, the town had 17 villages under its administration. As of 2016, the town was made up of 17 villages.

Villages:

- Bofan (孛畈村), Dumiao (杜庙村), Liulin (柳林村), Sanli (三里村), Yangyan (杨堰村), Yueling (月岭村), Banjin (板金村), Chenhe (陈河村), Changsong (长松村), Hengshan (横山村), Caopeng (曹棚村), Qinglongtan (青龙潭村), Longwo (龙窝村), Tongxing (同兴村), Zhangfan (张畈村), Tianzigang (天子岗村), Caofan (曹畈村)

== Demographics ==
Historical population
Year	Pop.	±% p.a.
2000	37,002	—
2010	24,765	−3.94%
2000 & 2010

== See also ==
- List of township-level divisions of Hubei
