= Tong Guan =

Chinese eunuch and politician (died 1126)

- Traditional Chinese: 童貫
- Simplified Chinese: 童贯
Transcriptions
Standard Mandarin
- Hanyu Pinyin: Tóng Guàn
- Wade–Giles: Tung Kuan

Tong Guan (c. 1054–1126), courtesy name Daofu (Chinese: 道夫), was a Chinese court eunuch, military general, political adviser, and state councillor to Emperor Huizong of the Song dynasty. In the classical novel Water Margin, Tong Guan is fictionalised as a corrupt government official and an enemy of the 108 Stars of Destiny.

== Life and career ==
Tong Guan began his military career under the mentorship of a leading eunuch general of the 1080s and became one of the few eunuch generals of the Song dynasty. Despite being a eunuch, it was written by many that Tong Guan had strong personal character and was in peak physical condition, with a long beard that was considered unusual for eunuchs. After Tong Guan gained his first victory in battle in 1104, Emperor Huizong granted him a valuable document of his own calligraphy written in his unique "slender gold" style. After Tong Guan gained a greater reputation by commanding a series of victorious battles in the northwest against the Tanguts, he became the favourite general and advisor of Emperor Huizong. In 1111, he went on a diplomatic mission to the Khitan-led Liao dynasty to the northeast, and after this his career steadily advanced. The following year, he was promoted to the top of the military command structure and by 1116 he was the first eunuch in the Song dynasty to gain entry into the top echelons of central administration as one of the chief policy-makers. Tong Guan was involved in all of the elite social gatherings of the time, as his name appeared as a guest on numerous lists for organised parties and banquets hosted by Emperor Huizong. He was also one of only ten palace eunuchs who had their biographies as painters compiled and written for the court.

In the year 1118, Tong Guan suggested to Emperor Huizong that a military alliance with the Jurchens would be favourable in crushing the Liao dynasty once and for all. Emperor Huizong agreed, despite some protest by other ministers at court. In a secret alliance and mission of envoys across the borders, Tong Guan played a leading role in the agreement that was reached between the Jurchens and the Song dynasty to divide the Liao dynasty's territory (while the Song would ultimately obtain their coveted prize: the Sixteen Prefectures). In 1120, at the age of 66, Tong Guan was put in command of an army to begin the assault on the Liao dynasty's southern capital, Yanjing. However, the campaign was halted for a time when word came to Tong Guan's camp that a revolt had broken out within the Song Empire, Fang La's rebellion in Zhejiang. His army was forced to march several hundred miles south to Zhejiang in order to suppress this rebellion. After successfully quelling this rebellion, his army marched back north but was routed in battle. Shortly after this, the Jurchens defeated the Liao dynasty at Yanjing and occupied the city. The city of Yanjing was turned over to Song forces only after a substantial payment was made to the Jurchens. Due to his losses and inability to take Yanjing, when Tong Guan returned to Kaifeng, he was forced to retire from his post as commander.

Although he was earlier forced to retire, in 1124, Tong Guan was called back into military service by Emperor Huizong, who trusted no other general more than Tong Guan to head the mission across the northern border. During this northern expedition, Tong Guan and his troops removed the long-established defensive forest on the Song-Liao border, exposing the vulnerable flat terrain in the North China Plain to future attacks from the north. However, in the last month of 1125, Tong Guan fled across the border back to Kaifeng to deliver the ill-fated news that the Jurchens had begun an invasion of the Song dynasty. Tong Guan was made the leader of Emperor Huizong's personal bodyguard after the emperor abdicated the throne and fled from Kaifeng.

Tong Guan was later blamed for much of the disaster that befell the Song dynasty when the Jurchens conquered northern China. Emperor Huizong's successor, Emperor Qinzong, had Tong Guan executed.
