= Siege of De'an =

Siege in China in 1132

- Part of the Jin–Song Wars
Date	1132
Location	De'an (modern Anlu in eastern Hubei), China
Result	Song victory

Belligerents
Rebels	Southern Song

Commanders and leaders
Li Heng	Chen Gui

Strength
10,000	Unknown

The siege of De'an (德安之戰) was fought as part of the Jin–Song Wars of China in 1132, during the Jin invasion of Hubei and Shaanxi. The battle between the besiegers, a group of rebels led by Li Heng and the Song Chinese defenders is important in global history as the first recorded instance of the fire lance, an early ancestor of firearms, being used in battle.

== Background ==
After the Jingkang crisis, the Song capital Kaifeng fell to the Jurchens. In 1130, the Jurchens established a puppet state called Great Qi to govern the newly acquired land. Liu Yu, a former Song governor of Jinan who capitulated to the Jurchens, was appointed as Great Qi's emperor. Liu Yu's regime was unpopular to the people, which led to several rebellions. One of the rebel leaders, Sang Chong (桑冲), pledged allegiance to the Southern Song emperor. However, Huo Ming, a Song general, suspecting Sang Chong to be a Jurchen spy, ordered to kill him. Li Heng, Sang Chong's subordinate, then led the rebel forces against the Southern Song.

De'an was successfully defended by Chen Gui against a Jin attack in 1127.

== Battle ==
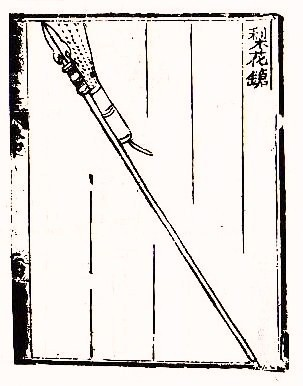
A fire lance as depicted in the Huolongjing.

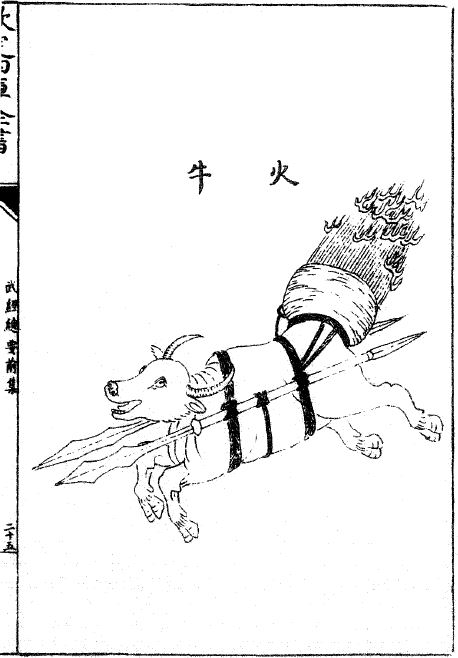
A fire ox from the Huolongjing

Rebel forces led by Li Heng (李橫) encircled the city of De'an (德安; modern Anlu in eastern Hubei) with a force of 10,000, established around 70 stockades, and set up watch towers to observe enemy movements within the city and relay their positions by fire at night and bright flags by day. Carpenters, smiths, and leatherworkers from nearby areas were forced to construct mobile assault towers called "sky bridges" that could be wheeled to the walls for soldiers to make a frontal assault on the ramparts. In response, the prefect of De'an, Chen Gui (陳規) ordered the garrisons to construct defensive structures atop the walls to hide their movements and protect against enemy arrows and trebuchet projectiles. These were constantly damaged by enemy fire, but were repaired in kind. After defensive structures had been completed, trebuchets were deployed to return fire against enemy siege weapons, damaging them to great effect. The protracted siege forced enemy troops to scour the countryside for food while De'an's moat prevented a direct attack on the city itself. Eventually rebels resorted to using children, women, and the elderly to gather material, including their own bodies, to fill the moat, but this was ultimately unsuccessful as Chen retaliated by firing gunpowder arrows into the moat, burning the wood and straw filling. Siege forces tried again, this time with mud and brick caked filling, and once they deemed the moat sufficiently filled, started their assault. Sky bridges rolled up to the walls under cover of archers and trebuchet fire, but Chen's defenders used long beams to keep them from getting any closer than ten feet from the walls.

While soldiers were stuck on their assault platforms, De'an defenders unleashed the fire lances: "Using fire-bomb potion (火砲藥), long bamboo lances were made ready. More than twenty of them, as well as good numbers of striking spears and hook-blade staves (鉤鐮), all of which would be deployed, with two people holding one together, and which were made in such a way that when the sky bridges approached the wall, [the defenders could] emerge from above and below their defense structures and deploy them." Fire lancers used their weapons to attack the sky bridge porters: "As the sky bridges became stuck fast, more than ten feet from the walls and unable to get any closer, [the defenders] were ready. From below and above the defensive structures they emerged and attacked with fire lances, striking lances, and hooked sickles, each in turn. The people [i.e., the porters] at the base of the sky bridges were repulsed. Pulling their bamboo ropes, they [the porters] ended up drawing the sky bridge back in an anxious and urgent rush, going about fifty paces before stopping."

During the siege, Chen was wounded in the foot by a trebuchet and supplies became scarce in the city. Chen maintained troop morale by using his personal funds to supply the troops. Seventy days into the siege, Li Heng sent a messenger into the city indicating that he would lift the siege if Chen would send him a maiden. Chen, realizing that the enemy forces were also in a dire situation by proposing such an odd offer, refused despite the entreaties of his commanders. Seizing the critical moment, Chen released a drove of oxen enraged by setting fire to their tails, and personally led a group of 60 fire lancers out from the west gate to make a direct attack on the sky bridge soldiers. Defenders on the walls threw bricks and shot arrows in conjunction with trebuchets hurling bombs and rocks. The sky bridges were burned with incendiary bundles of grass and firewood and their destruction caused the complete collapse of rebel morale. The commander Li Heng decided to lift the siege and retreat with severe casualties.

== Legacy ==
The siege of De'an marks an important transition and landmark in the history of gunpowder weapons as the "fire potion" (火藥, which has passed down as the Chinese word for gunpowder) of the fire lances were described using a new word: "fire bomb potion" (火炮藥), rather than simply "fire potion". This could imply the use of a new more potent formula, or simply an acknowledgement of the specialized military application of gunpowder. Peter Lorge suggests that this "bomb powder" may have been corned, making it distinct from normal gunpowder. Evidence of gunpowder firecrackers also points to their appearance at roughly around the same time fire potion was making its transition in the literary imagination. Fire lances continued to be used as anti-personnel weapons into the 12th century, and were even attached to battle carts in one situation in 1163. Song commander Wei Sheng constructed several hundred of these carts known as "at-your-desire-war-carts" (如意戰車), which contained fire lances protruding from protective covering on the sides. They were used to defend mobile trebuchets that hurled fire bombs.
