= Yandian, Hubei =

Yandian 烟店镇
- Town
- Location in Hubei
- Coordinates (Yandian Junior High School): 31°19′38″N 113°34′48″E
- Country: People's Republic of China
- Province: Hubei
- Prefecture-level city: Xiaogan
- County-level city: Anlu
- Village-level divisions: 4 communities, 36 villages

Area
  - Total: 110.8 km^{2} (42.8 sq mi)
- Elevation: 82 m (269 ft)

Population (2010)
  - Total: 36,269
  - Density: 327.3/km^{2} (847.8/sq mi)
- Time zone: UTC+8 (China Standard)

Yandian (simplified Chinese: 烟店; traditional Chinese: 煙店; pinyin: Yāndiàn) is a town under the administration of the county-level city of Anlu in northeastern Hubei province, China, located 14 kilometres (8.7 mi) northwest of downtown Anlu and just east of G70 Fuzhou–Yinchuan Expressway.

== History ==
During the Tang dynasty, famed Chinese poet Li Bai lived and wrote poems at Bi Mountain (碧山), today Baizhao Mountain (白兆山) in Yandian.

In 2017 fifth periodical awarding of the title, the town of Yandian was given the title "National Civilized Town". Yandian has also received other awards and titles including "China's Most Beautiful Town", "China's Most Unique Town", "National Ecological Town", "Provincial Public Health Town", "Hubei Forestry Town", "Hubei Model Town for New Rural Construction", "Most Attractive Tourist Town in Hubei", "National Civilized Town" "123 Pilot Demonstration Town Industry Amalgamation in Rural Areas in Hubei", and "Tourist Town with Chinese Characteristics" and other honorary titles, was nominated for "Most Beautiful Jingchu Culture Town".

== Geography ==
The town of Yandian is located in the central part of Anlu. It is bounded to the east by the Yun river (涢河水) and to the west by Baizhao Mountain (白兆山). The terrain is higher in the west and lower in the east. There is a belt of mountains, a belt of hills and a belt of flat land. Yandian contains the rich resources of river sand, clay, limestone and other mineral resources.

== Administrative divisions ==
As of 2011, the town of Yandian had 40 villages under its administration. As of 2016, it was made up of forty village-level divisions including four communities and thirty-six villages.

Four communities:

- Yuanfan (袁畈社区), Yuzhai (余寨社区), Songlong (宋垅社区), and Baidian (白店社区)

Thirty-six villages:

- Yandian (烟店村), Bishan (碧山村), Zhouqiao (周桥村), Shuizhai (水寨村), Shuangling (双岭村), Baishu (柏树村), Chalu (岔路村), Ligang (李岗村), Jianshan (尖山村), Feigang (费岗村), Xiaowan (肖湾村), Changgang (长岗村), Zhouci (周祠村), Huangpeng (黄棚村), Guanyan (关堰村), Zhanggang (张岗村), Zhouchong (周冲村), Liwan (李湾村), Tianwan (田湾村), Chengxiang (程巷村), Gonggang (龚岗村), Wanqiao (万桥村), Wanggang (王岗村), Shuangmiao (双庙村), Denghe (邓河村), Denggang (邓岗村), Henglu (横路村), Dongqiao (董桥村), Shihe (石河村), Zhuluo (竹罗村), Fengmiao (冯庙村), Yaozha (姚榨村), Huangzha (黄榨村), Dengchong (邓冲村), Balicun (八里村), and Pengqiao (彭桥村)

== Economy ==
Yandian's industries include stone processing, pottery/earth building materials, agriculture, and tourist services. Tourist attractions include the Local Culture Historical Street, Model Tang Dynasty Ancient Village with Tang Dynasty flags, Taibai Street with 400 stores, numerous statues of Li Bai and a large 3-D version of Li Bai.

== Demographics ==
Historical population
Year	Pop.	±% p.a.
2000	42,815	—
2010	36,269	−1.65%
2000 & 2010

== Transportation ==
Seven major roads cross through Yandian including Wuhan-Shiyan Expressway and Railway, Provincial Roads Yanying Highway, Anjing Highway, Datian Highway, and City Roads Ansan Road and Shuiqing Road. In all, there is 118.7 kilometers of highway.

== Culture ==
Li Bai lived and wrote poems at Bi Mountain (碧山), today Baizhao Mountain (白兆山). Bi Mountain (碧山) in the poem Question and Answer Amongst the Mountains (山中问答) refers to this mountain.

== See also ==
- List of township-level divisions of Hubei
