= Anlu =

Anlu 安陆市
- County-level city
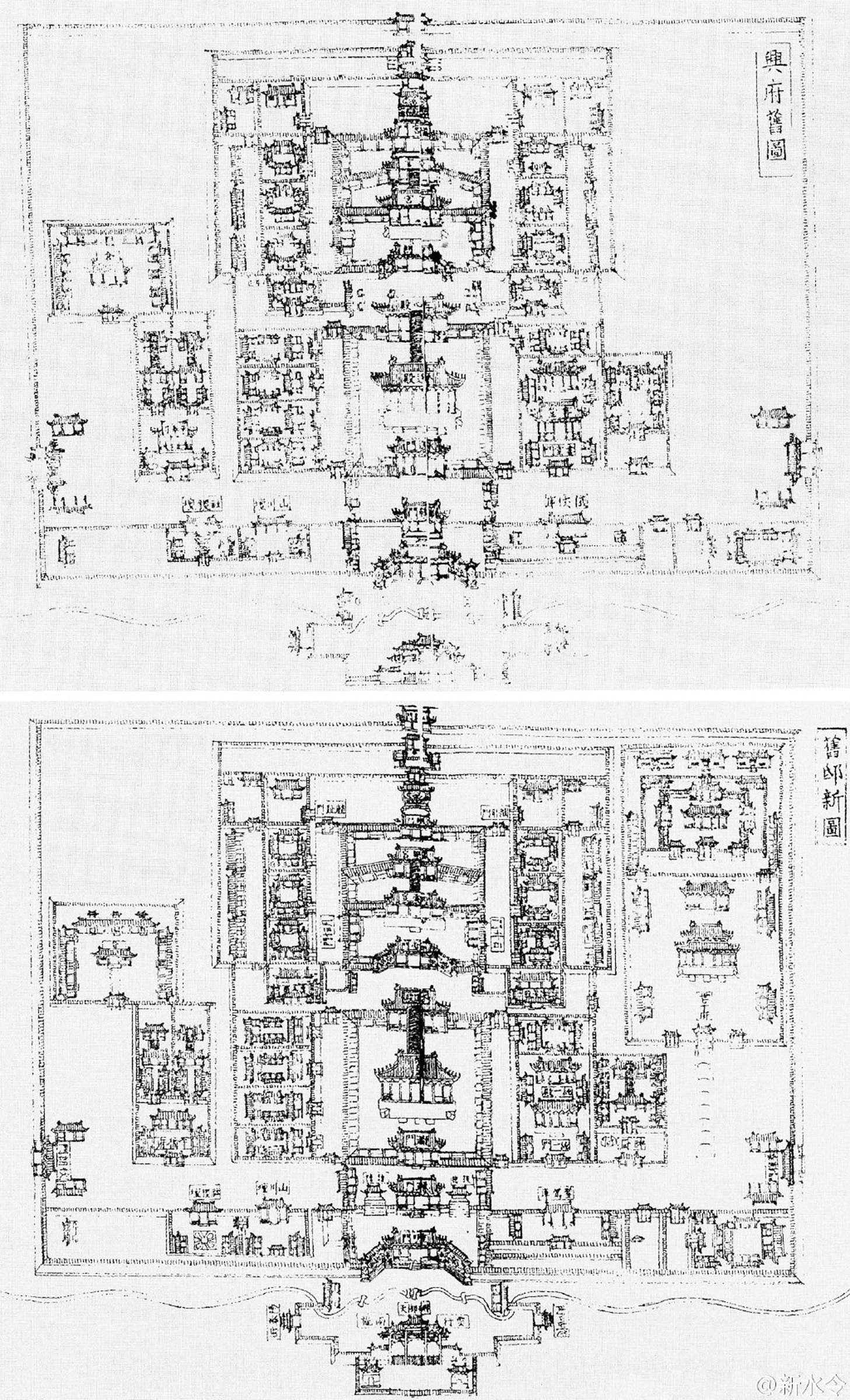
- Palace of Prince Xing, Ming Dynasty, Anlu, Hubei

- Location in Hubei
- Coordinates: 31°16′N 113°40′E
- Country: People's Republic of China
- Province: Hubei
- Prefecture-level city: Xiaogan

Area
  - Urban: 91.10 km^{2} (35.17 sq mi)

Population (2020)
  - County-level city: 498,356
  - Urban: 280,695
- Website: www.anlu.gov.cn

Anlu (simplified Chinese: 安陆; traditional Chinese: 安陸; pinyin: Ānlù) is a county-level city in east-central Hubei province, China. It is under the administration of the prefecture-level city of Xiaogan. The siege of De'an took place here during the Song-Jin Wars.

== Administrative divisions ==
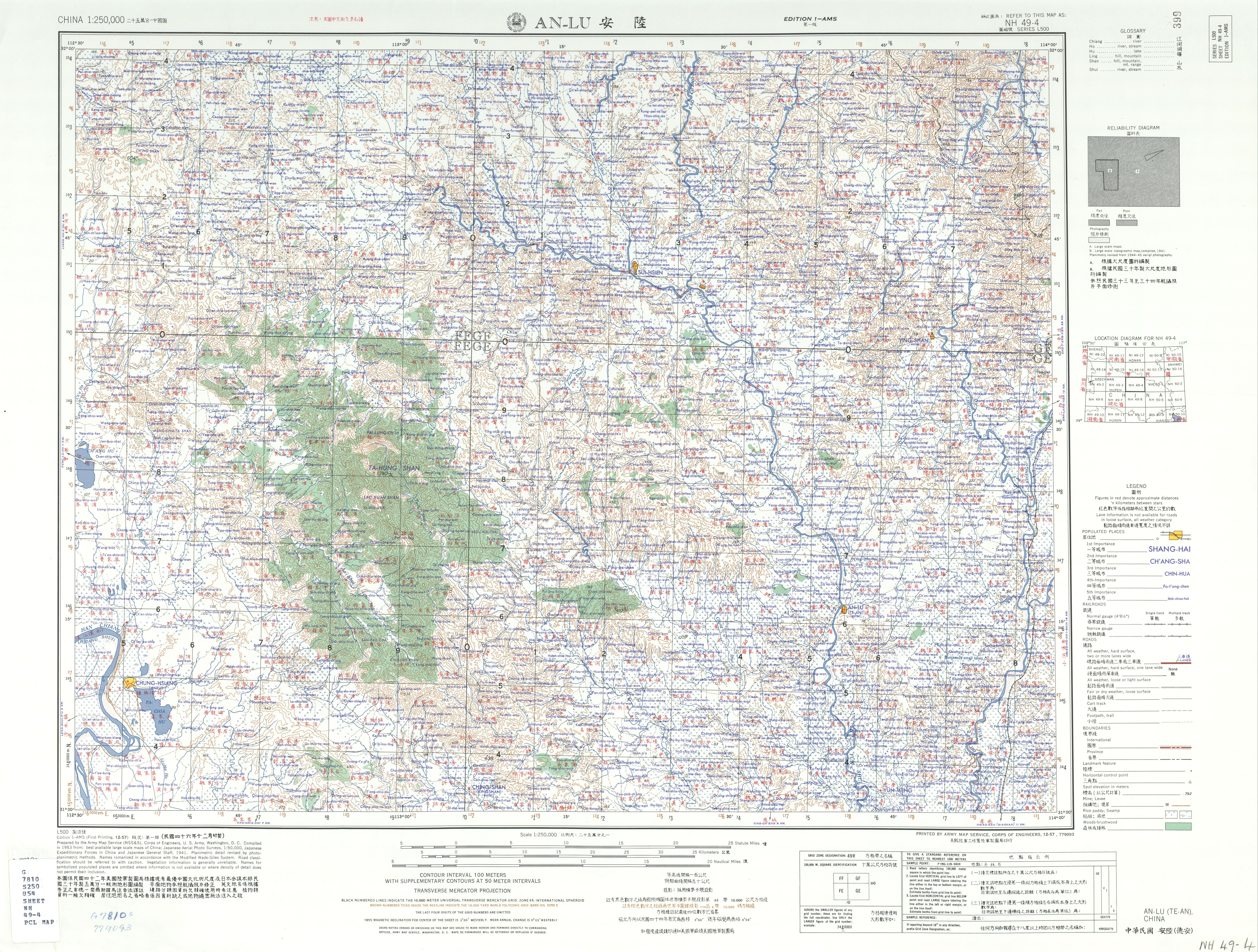
Map including Anlu (labeled as AN-LU (TE-AN) 安陸(德安)) (1953)

Two subdistricts:

- Fucheng Subdistrict (府城街道), Nancheng Subdistrict (南城街道).

Nine towns:

- Zhaopeng (赵棚镇), Lidian (李店镇), Xundian (巡店镇), Tangdi (棠棣镇), Leigong (雷公镇), Wangyizhen (王义贞镇), Yandian (烟店镇), Bofan (孛畈镇), Fushui (洑水镇) (Note: The rarely used character fù (洑) in Fushui (洑水镇) is sometimes written as the more commonly encountered and homophone character fú (伏) (伏水镇), which is the phonetic component of fù (洑).)

Four townships:

- Chendian Township (陈店乡), Xinzha Township (辛榨乡), Muzi Township (木梓乡), Jieguan Township (接官乡)

One other area:

- Anlu Economic Development Area (安陆市开发区)

== History ==
Chinese people republic

September 1987: Anlu became a town according to the documents from central government.

== Location ==
Anlu is at the northeastern part of Hubei province, near Mount Tongbo and Mount Dahong. Route 316, Route 107, Hanshi expressway, and Handan railway goes through the city. Anlu is 80 km from Wuhan.

== Physiognomy ==
10.8% lands are high hills. 10% lands are plain. 79.2% lands are low hills. There are more than 20 small mountains, including Mount Baizhao, Mount Daan, Mount Cha, Mount Yueluo. The highest point whose altitude is 517 meters locates at the Taiping Village. The lowest point whose altitude is 31 meters locates at Guzhou Bay.

== Climate ==
Anlu’s climate is subtropical monsoon. There are 60 days for spring and autumn and 120 days for winter and summer. Summer is humid and hot, while winter is dry and cold. Yearly mean temperature is 15.8°C. Lowest temperature is −15.3 °C (Jan 30, 1977). Highest temperature is 40.5°C (August 23, 1959). Yearly mean amount of precipitation is 1172 millimeter. Highest yearly amount of precipitation is 1172.6 millimeter (1954). Lowest yearly amount of precipitation is 652.9 millimeter (1978). Most raining days are from April to August.

Climate data for Anlu, elevation 54 m (177 ft), (1991–2020 normals, extremes 1981–present)
Month	Jan	Feb	Mar	Apr	May	Jun	Jul	Aug	Sep	Oct	Nov	Dec	Year
Record high °C (°F)	19.7 (67.5)	26.5 (79.7)	32.9 (91.2)	35.0 (95.0)	36.6 (97.9)	37.7 (99.9)	38.4 (101.1)	39.2 (102.6)	38.2 (100.8)	34.3 (93.7)	28.0 (82.4)	21.1 (70.0)	39.2 (102.6)
Mean daily maximum °C (°F)	8.0 (46.4)	11.1 (52.0)	16.1 (61.0)	22.5 (72.5)	27.2 (81.0)	30.1 (86.2)	32.4 (90.3)	32.3 (90.1)	28.6 (83.5)	23.1 (73.6)	16.6 (61.9)	10.3 (50.5)	21.5 (70.8)
Daily mean °C (°F)	3.5 (38.3)	6.4 (43.5)	11.2 (52.2)	17.3 (63.1)	22.3 (72.1)	25.9 (78.6)	28.4 (83.1)	27.7 (81.9)	23.6 (74.5)	17.9 (64.2)	11.5 (52.7)	5.6 (42.1)	16.8 (62.2)
Mean daily minimum °C (°F)	0.3 (32.5)	2.8 (37.0)	7.2 (45.0)	13.0 (55.4)	18.2 (64.8)	22.5 (72.5)	25.2 (77.4)	24.4 (75.9)	19.9 (67.8)	14.0 (57.2)	7.7 (45.9)	2.2 (36.0)	13.1 (55.6)
Record low °C (°F)	−9.1 (15.6)	−8.3 (17.1)	−3.3 (26.1)	−0.1 (31.8)	8.1 (46.6)	13.2 (55.8)	18.8 (65.8)	15.5 (59.9)	10.7 (51.3)	1.2 (34.2)	−4.8 (23.4)	−12.3 (9.9)	−12.3 (9.9)
Average precipitation mm (inches)	30.9 (1.22)	41.4 (1.63)	61.1 (2.41)	101.6 (4.00)	135.1 (5.32)	181.3 (7.14)	203.8 (8.02)	132.6 (5.22)	70.6 (2.78)	70.9 (2.79)	46.9 (1.85)	21.6 (0.85)	1,097.8 (43.23)
Average precipitation days (≥ 0.1 mm)	7.4	8.6	10.5	10.2	11.7	10.1	10.7	9.3	7.5	9.1	8.0	6.4	109.5
Average snowy days	4.0	2.5	0.9	0.1	0	0	0	0	0	0	0.5	1.5	9.5
Average relative humidity (%)	72	72	71	72	73	78	80	78	74	73	73	70	74
Mean monthly sunshine hours	102.4	104.2	133.5	162.3	172.8	165.4	208.1	218.1	169.0	155.2	136.4	118.6	1,846
Percentage possible sunshine	32	33	36	42	41	39	48	54	46	44	43	38	41
Source: China Meteorological Administration

== Land Resources ==
Total land area is 1355 square kilometers. The arable land is 50167.09 hectares, which is 37.1% of the total area. Garden covers an area of 917.68 hectares, which is 0.4% of the total area. Forest land area is 29498.77 hectares, which is 21.7% of the total area. The combination of villages and industrial land area is 13171.2 hectares, which is 9.7% of the total area. Traffic land area is 1651.3 hectares, which is 1.2% of the total area. Water area is 17161.0 hectares, which is 12.7% of the total area. The unused area is 22,725.1 hectares, which is 17.2% of the total land area.

== Water resources ==
The river course is a part of the Yangtze River basin. Fu River basin covers 677 square kilometers, which is 50.6% of the total water areas. Zhang River basin covers 232 square kilometers, which is 17.7%. The Zishi River basin covers 100 square kilometers, which is 0.7%. Qingshui River basin covers 16 square kilometers, which is 0.1%. The main river is Fu River and Zhang River, with a total length of 78.7 kilometers. The total length of the river is 812.7 km. The river network density is 0.6 kilometers per square kilometers. The runoff volume is 500 million cubic meters. The annual drainage volume is 1.45 billion cubic meters. The maximum annual drainage volume is 1.8 billion cubic meters. The largest river in the territory is Fu River, which flows from north to south through Burgundy, Yandian, Fushui, Fucheng, Nancheng, Tangdi, Xundian and Xinli. The river basin covers an area of 677 square kilometers, with an average annual runoff of 3570 cubic meters per second.

== Population ==
In 2019, There were 201,700 households in Anlu, with a registered population of 617,100 (143,500 in urban areas and 473,600 in rural areas). There were 318,200 males and 298,900 females. There were 10,500 aged 17 and under, and 109,500 aged 60 and over. At the end of the year, the city's permanent population is 583,300. The permanent population urbanization rate is 52.63%. In 2019, 7,983 people (4,143 males and 3,840 females) were born, among whom 3,979 had a second child. The birth rate was 12.32‰. There were 2,643 deaths, with a mortality rate of 4.08 per 1,000 people; The natural population growth rate is 8.24 per thousand
