= Zhang Bangchang =

Zhang Bangchang 張邦昌

Emperor of Da Chu
- Reign: 20 April 1127 – 23 May 1127
- Born: 1081
- Died: 1 November 1127 (aged 45–46)

Zhang Bangchang (Chinese: 張邦昌; Wade–Giles: Chang Pang-ch'ang; 1081 – 1 November 1127), was a puppet ruler of Da Chu and a prime minister of the Song dynasty. He was executed by Emperor Gaozong of Song after he surrendered.

== Early life ==
Before he became a puppet ruler, he was a prime minister serving the Song dynasty.

== Reign ==
=== Formation of Da Chu ===
The Jin leadership had not expected or desired the fall of the Song dynasty. Their intention was to weaken the Song in order to demand more tribute, and they were unprepared for the magnitude of their victory. The Jurchens were preoccupied with strengthening their rule over the areas once controlled by Liao. Instead of continuing their invasion of the Song, an empire with a military that outnumbered their own, they adopted the strategy of "using Chinese to control the Chinese".

=== Enthronement ===
The Jin hoped a proxy state would be capable of administering Northern China and collecting the annual indemnity without requiring Jurchen interventions to quell Anti-Jin uprisings. Instead of directly annexing the conquered Song territories, the Jin dynasty formed the buffer state of Chu in 1127. Zhang, a former prime minister of the Song dynasty, was installed as emperor of the new dynasty. He refused to wear the formal clothing of the emperor outside of his encounters with Jin officials. The offer of enthronement was too attractive for Zhang to resist, but he had reservations about his new role. Jiankang, modern Nanjing, became the capital of Chu. The support of Empress Dowager Yuanyou, who was dismissed as empress by her former spouse Emperor Zhezong, was enlisted to bolster the legitimacy of the puppet government.

Unfortunately, Da Chu did not deter the resistance in Northern China, but the insurgents were motivated by their anger towards the Jurchens' looting rather than by a sense of loyalty towards the inept Song court. A number of Song commanders, stationed in towns scattered across northern China, retained their allegiance to the Song, and armed volunteers organized militias opposed to the Jurchen military presence. The insurgency hampered the ability of the Jin to exert control over the north.

=== Downfall and death ===
The Da Chu was abolished when Zhang and Empress Dowager Yuanyou agreed to recognize Emperor Gaozong as the new ruler of the revived Southern Song. Zhang submitted to Gaozong, but was sentenced to death by being coerced into suicide on November 1, 1127. Gaozong ordered the execution under pressure from Li Gang, his chief councilor, who opposed diplomatic reconciliation with the Jin and wanted Zhang executed for collaborating with the Jurchen government.

== Legacy ==
The elimination of Zhang and the Chu buffer state infringed on the treaty that the Jin and Song had negotiated. The Jin then recommenced their war with the Song. The invasion was hampered by the ongoing insurgency by Song loyalists in Northern China.

== Bibliography ==
- Franke, Herbert (1994). "The Chin dynasty". In Denis Twitchett; John King Fairbank (eds.). The Cambridge History of China: Volume 6, Alien Regimes and Border States, 710–1368. Cambridge University Press. pp. 215–320. ISBN 978-0-521-24331-5.
- Lorge, Peter (2005). War, Politics and Society in Early Modern China, 900–1795. Routledge. ISBN 978-0-203-96929-8.
- Tao, Jing-Shen (2009). "The Move to the South and the Reign of Kao-tsung". In Paul Jakov Smith; Denis C. Twitchett (eds.). The Cambridge History of China: Volume 5, The Sung Dynasty and Its Precursors, 907-1279. Cambridge University Press. pp. 556–643. ISBN 978-0-521-81248-1.
