= Li Gang (Song dynasty) =

Li Gang 李綱
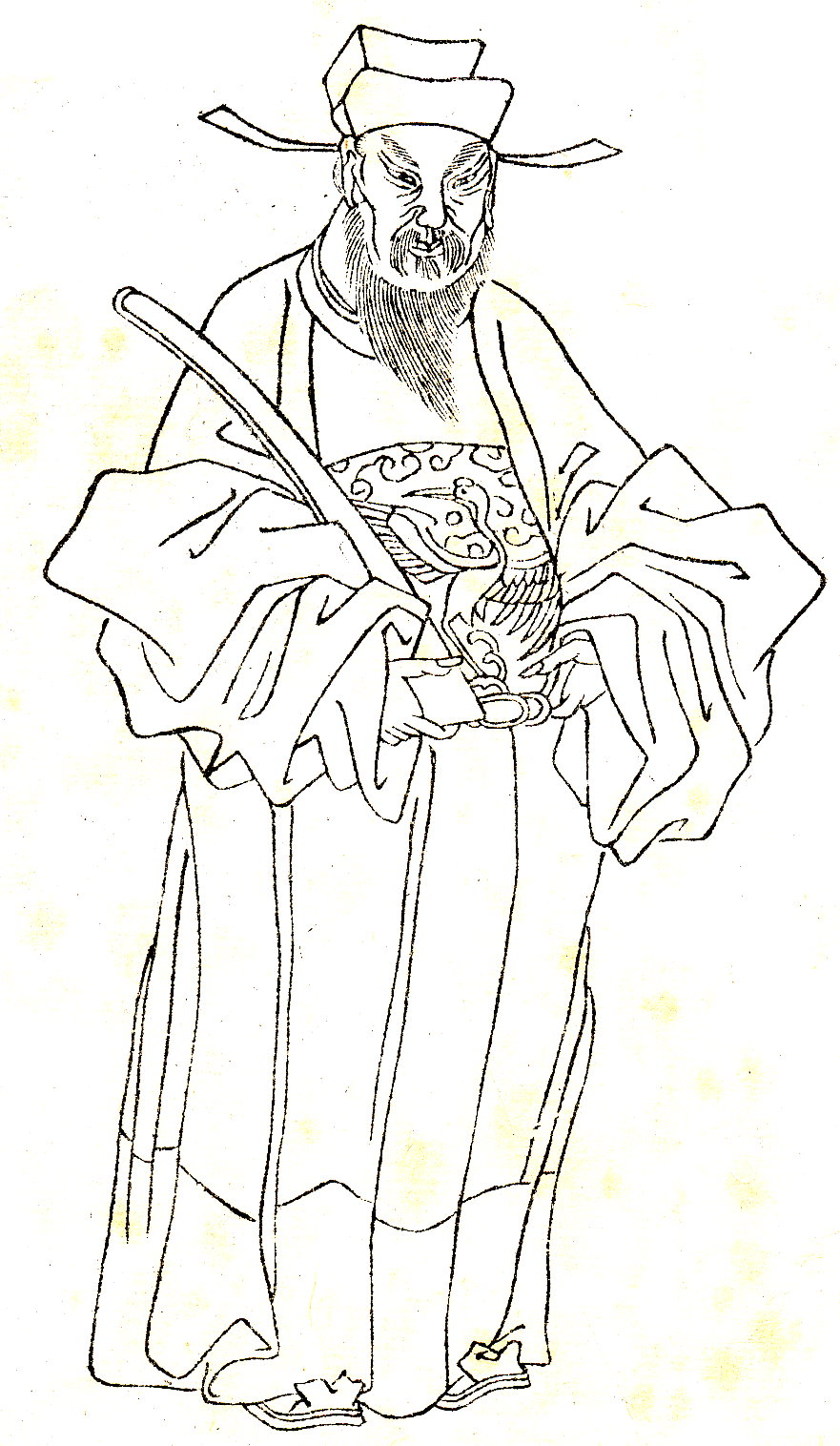

Grand Chancellor of the Song Dynasty
- In office 1127–1127
- Monarch: Emperor Qinzong

Personal details
- Born: 1083
- Died: 1140 (aged 56–57)
- Relatives: Emperor Aidi of Tang (claimed)

Li Gang (Chinese: 李綱; pinyin: Lǐ Gāng; 1083–1140) was a politician serving during the transition from the Northern Song to the Southern Song dynasty in the 1130s. He served as Grand Chancellor of Northern Song at its fall in 1127. He was also a general and a famous poet, having written over 1600 literary works.

== Biography ==
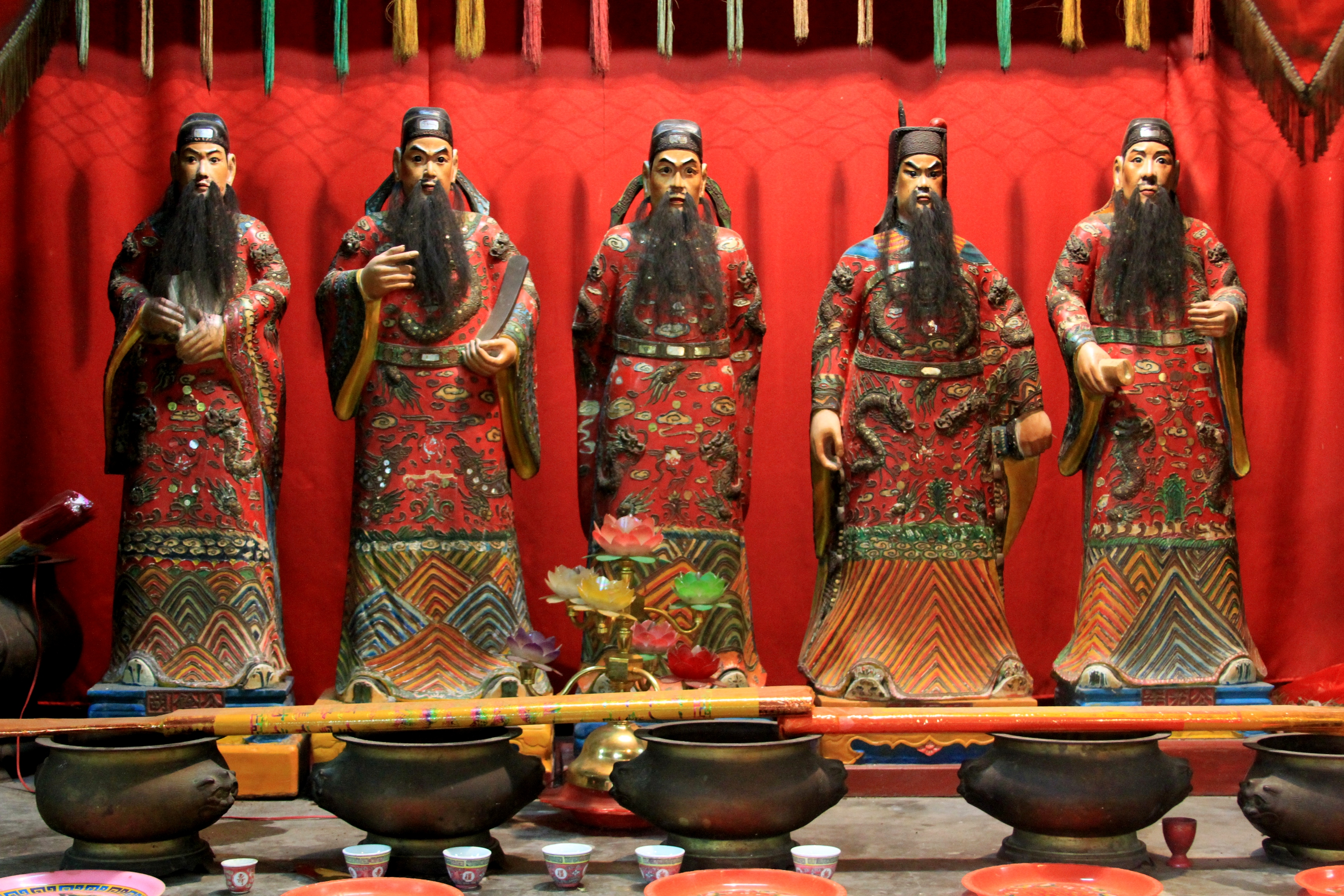
Statues of five exiled officials, including Li Gang, in the Temple of the Five Lords.

He claimed to be descended from Emperor Ai of Tang, the last Emperor of Tang through a son named Li Xizhao (李熙照).

In 1127, Emperor Qinzong appointed Li Gang to lead the Song military to fend off the Jurchens, but Qinzong removed Li Gang from his appointment in the hope of starting peace talks with the Jurchens and sent his younger brother Zhao Gou to negotiate. The negotiation worked but not before Zhao Gou was taken hostage, ransomed, and released. Despite this, the Jurchens renewed their war again due to Emperor Qinzong's decisions. Since Emperor Qinzong sent his generals to other parts of the country, Li Gang himself included, he was not captured during the Jingkang Incident but Emperor Qinzong was captured.

Zhao Gou later became Emperor Gaozong in June 1127.

Li Gang became Emperor Gaozong's chancellor and was responsible for pressuring him to execute Zhang Bangchang because Li Gang opposed diplomatic action with the Jurchens.

When one of Li Gang's guerrilla forces, the Red Scarf Army, scored a major victory against the Jin troops and almost captured their commander-in-chief, Gaozong dismissed the minister. The dismissal of Li Gang is seen as implying that Gaozong did not really want to win this battle.
