= Siege of Kaifeng (1232) =

1232–33 battle of the Mongol-Jin War

- Part of the Mongol–Jin War
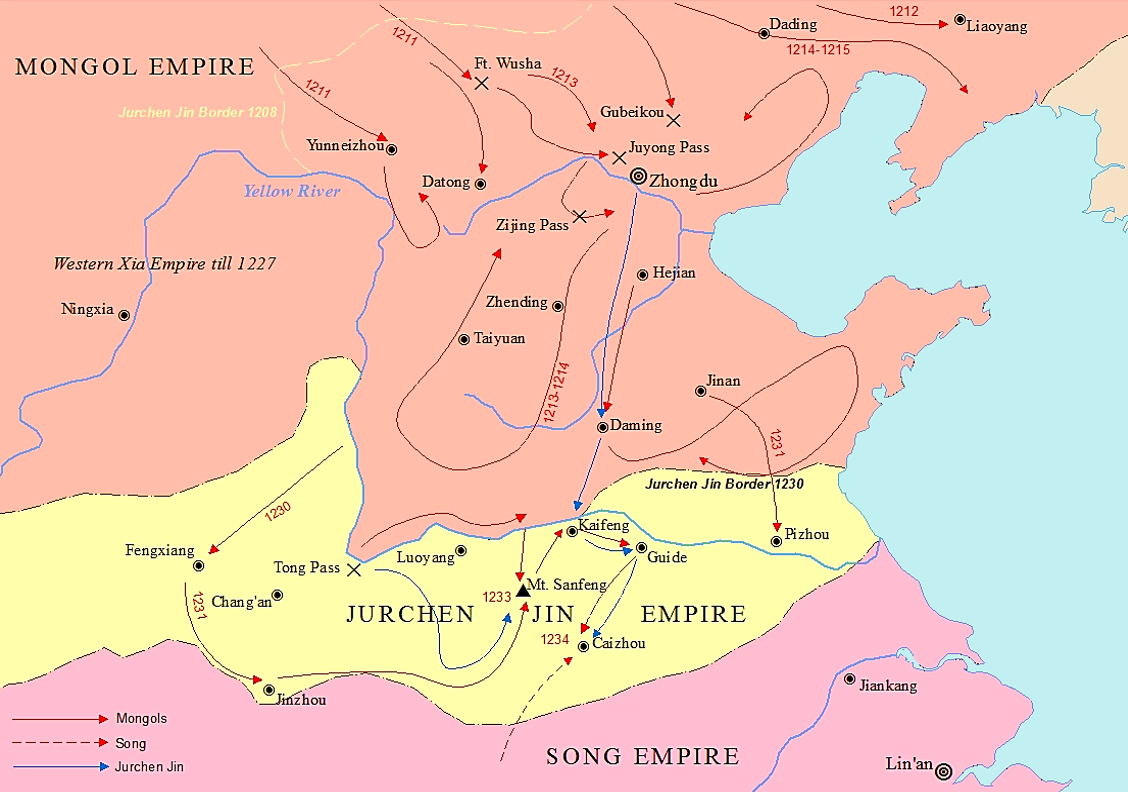
- Mongol Conquest of Jurchen Jin
Date	April 8, 1232 – May 29, 1233
Location	Kaifeng, Northern China
Result	Mongol victory; Emperor Aizong flees to Caizhou

Belligerents
Jin dynasty	Mongol Empire

Commanders and leaders
Emperor Aizong of Jin; Cui Li (Han officer who defected to the Mongols)	Subutai; Tolui; Ögedei; Tang Qing † (Han general)

Strength
300,000~ Total; 120,000~ Regulars (Jing-Jun); 100,000~ Irregular militias; 80,000-100,000~ Auxiliaries	15,000 (under Subutai); 30,000+ initially (before Ögedei and Tolui left)

Casualties and losses
~95% of defense force (approx. 285,000~); ~40-50% of the city's million-strong population perished	Significant attrition (~40% of initial force); Heavy losses sustained from Jin gunpowder weaponry

In the siege of Kaifeng from 1232 to 1233, the Mongol Empire captured Kaifeng, the capital of the Jurchen-led Jin dynasty. The Mongol Empire and the Jin dynasty had been at war for nearly two decades, beginning in 1211 after the Jin dynasty refused the Mongol offer to submit as a vassal. Ögedei Khan sent two armies to besiege Kaifeng, one led by himself, and the other by his brother Tolui. Command of the forces, once they converged into a single army, was given to Subutai who led the siege. The Mongols arrived at the walls of Kaifeng on April 8, 1232.

The siege deprived the city of resources, and its residents were beset with famine and disease. Jin soldiers defended the city with fire lances and grenades, killing many Mongols and severely injuring others. The Jin dynasty tried to arrange a peace treaty, but the assassination of a Mongol diplomat foiled their efforts. The Emperor Aizong of Jin fled the city for the town of Caizhou. The city was placed under the command of General Cui Li, who executed the emperor's loyalists and promptly surrendered to the Mongols. The Mongols entered Kaifeng on May 29, 1233, and looted the city. The dynasty fell after the suicide of Aizong and the capture of Caizhou in 1234.

== Background ==
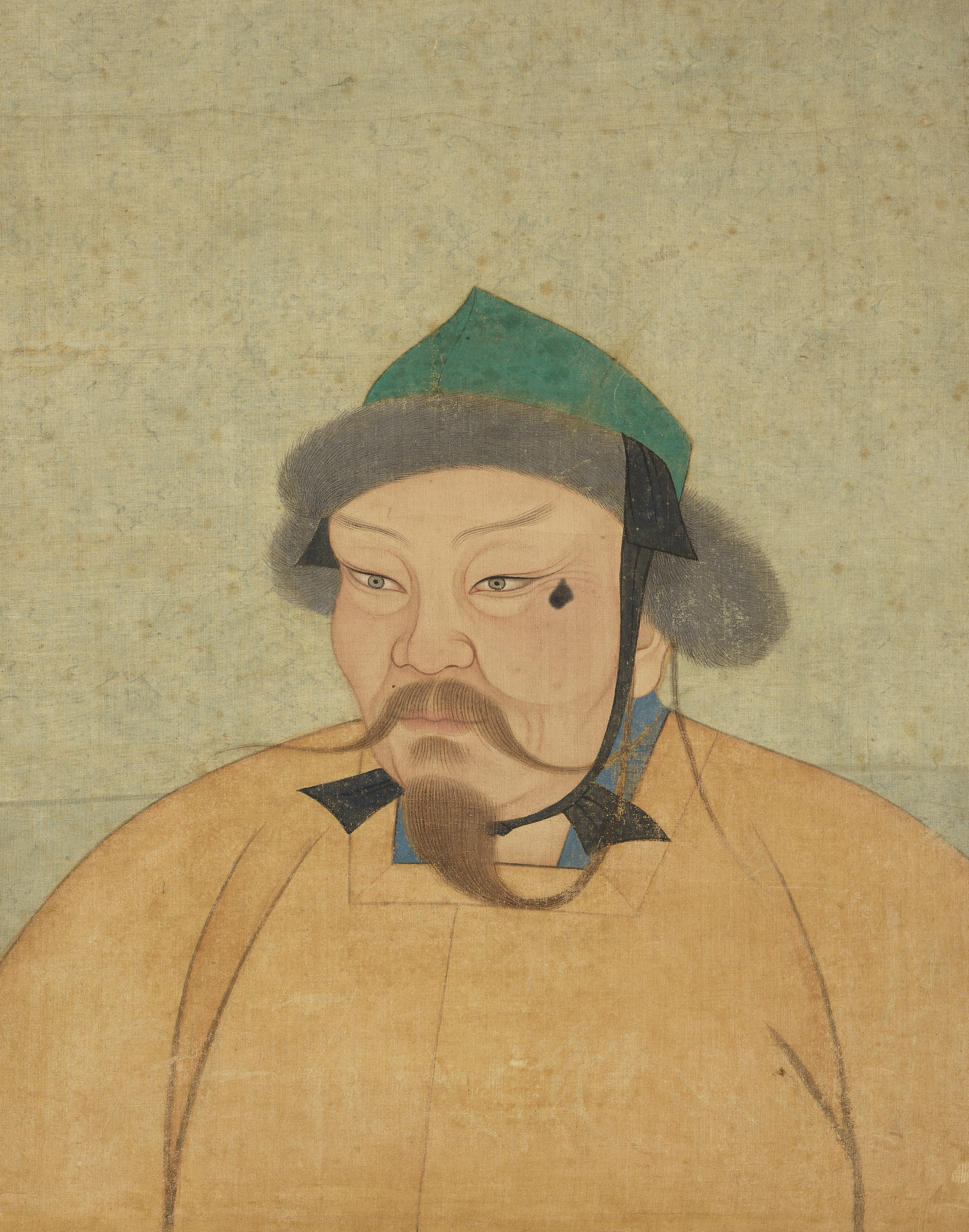
Ögedei Khan, successor of Genghis

Genghis Khan was declared Khaghan in 1206. The Mongols had united under his leadership, and defeated the rival tribes of the steppes. In the same period, China proper was divided into three separate dynastic states. In the north, the Jurchen-led Jin dynasty controlled Manchuria and all of China proper north of the Huai River. The Tangut-led Western Xia dynasty ruled parts of the western China, while the Song dynasty reigned over the south. The Mongols subjugated Western Xia in 1210. In that same year, the Mongols renounced their vassalage to the Jin. Hostilities between the Jin and Mongols had been building up. The Mongols coveted the prosperity of Jin territory. They may have also harbored a grudge against the Jin for assassinating Ambaghai, one of Genghis' predecessors, and for the Jin emperor Wanyan Yongji's rude behavior to Genghis Khan when Wanyan Yongji was still a Jurchen prince.

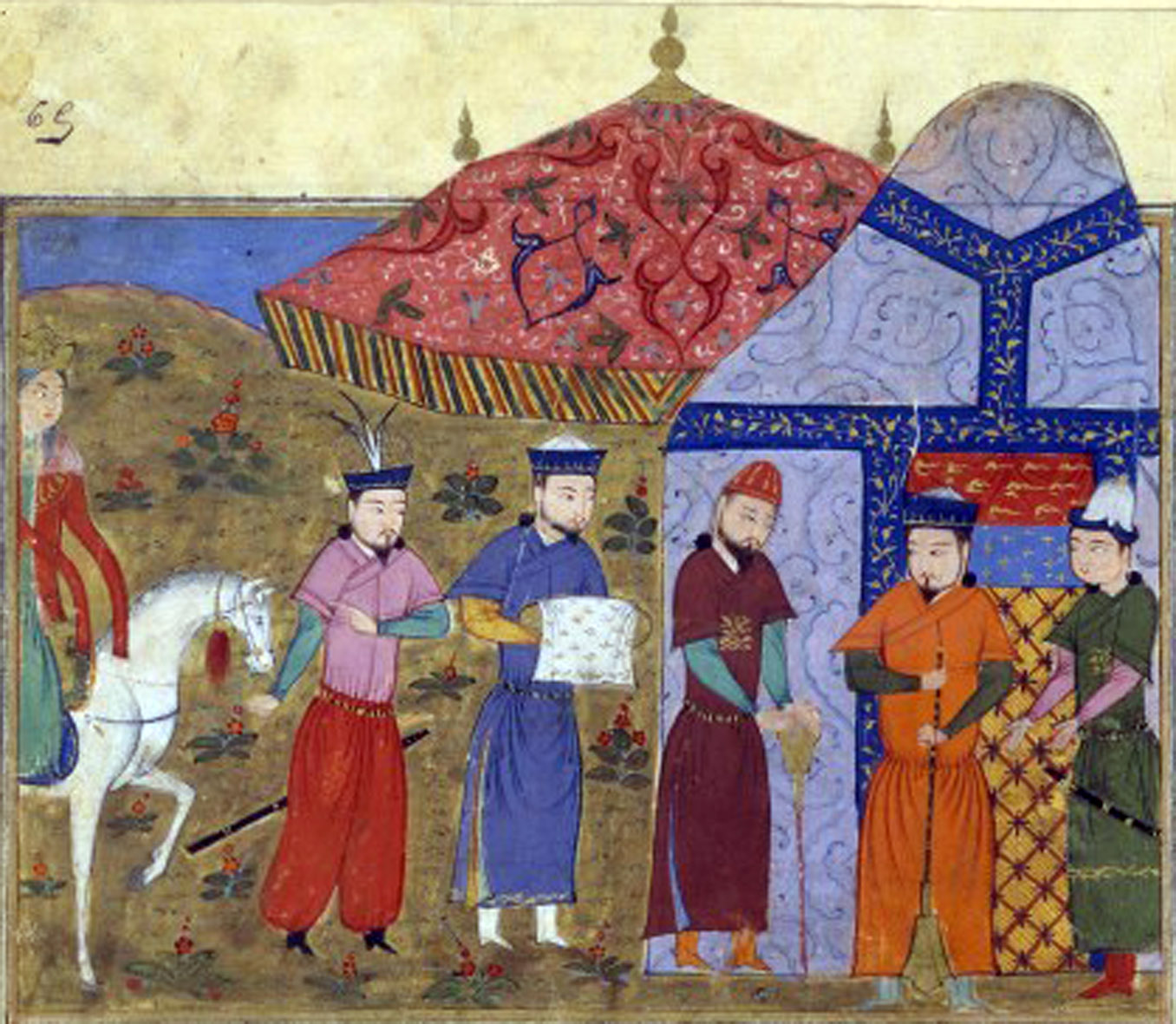
Genghis Khan receiving Jin envoys

The Mongols learned that a famine had struck the Jin, and invaded in 1211. Two armies were dispatched by the Mongols into Jin territory, with one under the command of Genghis himself. The Jin built up its armies and reinforced its cities in preparation for the Mongol incursion. The Mongol strategy was based on capturing small settlements and ignoring the fortifications of major cities. They looted the land and retreated in 1212. The Mongols returned the next year and besieged Zhongdu, the capital of the Jin, in 1213. The Mongols were not able to penetrate the walls of the city in the Battle of Zhongdu, but intimidated the Jin emperor into paying tribute. They withdrew in 1214. Later in the year, fearing another siege, the Jin moved their capital from Zhongdu to Kaifeng. The Mongols besieged Zhongdu once more in 1215 once they learned that the Jin court had fled from the city. The city fell on May 31, and by 1216, large swaths of Jin territory were under Mongol control.

Meanwhile, the Jin had been afflicted by multiple revolts. In Manchuria, the Khitans, under the leadership of Yelü Liuge, declared their independence from the Jin and allied with the Mongols. Yelü was enthroned a puppet ruler subordinate to the Mongols in 1213, and given the title emperor of the Liao dynasty. The Jurchen expedition sent against him commanded by Puxian Wannu was not successful. Wannu, realizing the Jin dynasty was on the verge of collapse, rebelled and declared himself king of Eastern Xia in 1215. Further south, rebellions had broken out in Shandong beginning with Yang Anguo's revolt in 1214. The rebels were known as Red Coats, from the color of the uniforms they wore starting in 1215. After the fall of Zhongdu in 1215, the Mongols downsized their war effort against the Jin, and shifted their resources in preparation for the invasion of Central Asia. The Jin tried to make up for their territorial losses to the Mongols by invading the Song in 1217. The invasion was fruitless, so the Jin wanted to negotiate for peace, but the Song rebuffed the offers. By 1218, Jurchen diplomats were prohibited from traveling to the Song. The Mongol war against the Jin had subsided, but not stopped, and went on through the early 1220s under the command of the general Muqali. Muqali died from sickness in 1223, and the Mongol campaigns against the Jin wound down. The Jin settled for peace with the Song, but the Song continued to assist the Red Coats insurgency against the Jin. Genghis Khan fell ill and died in 1227. Ögedei was his successor, and he renewed the war against the Jin in 1230.

The ethnic Han general Shi Tianze led troops to pursue Emperor Aizong as he retreated and destroyed an 80,000-strong Jin army led by Wanyan Chengyi (完顏承裔) at Pucheng (蒲城). Shi Tianze led a Han Tumen in the Mongol army since his family under his father Shi Bingzhi defected to the Mongols under Muqali against the Jin.

== Siege of Kaifeng ==
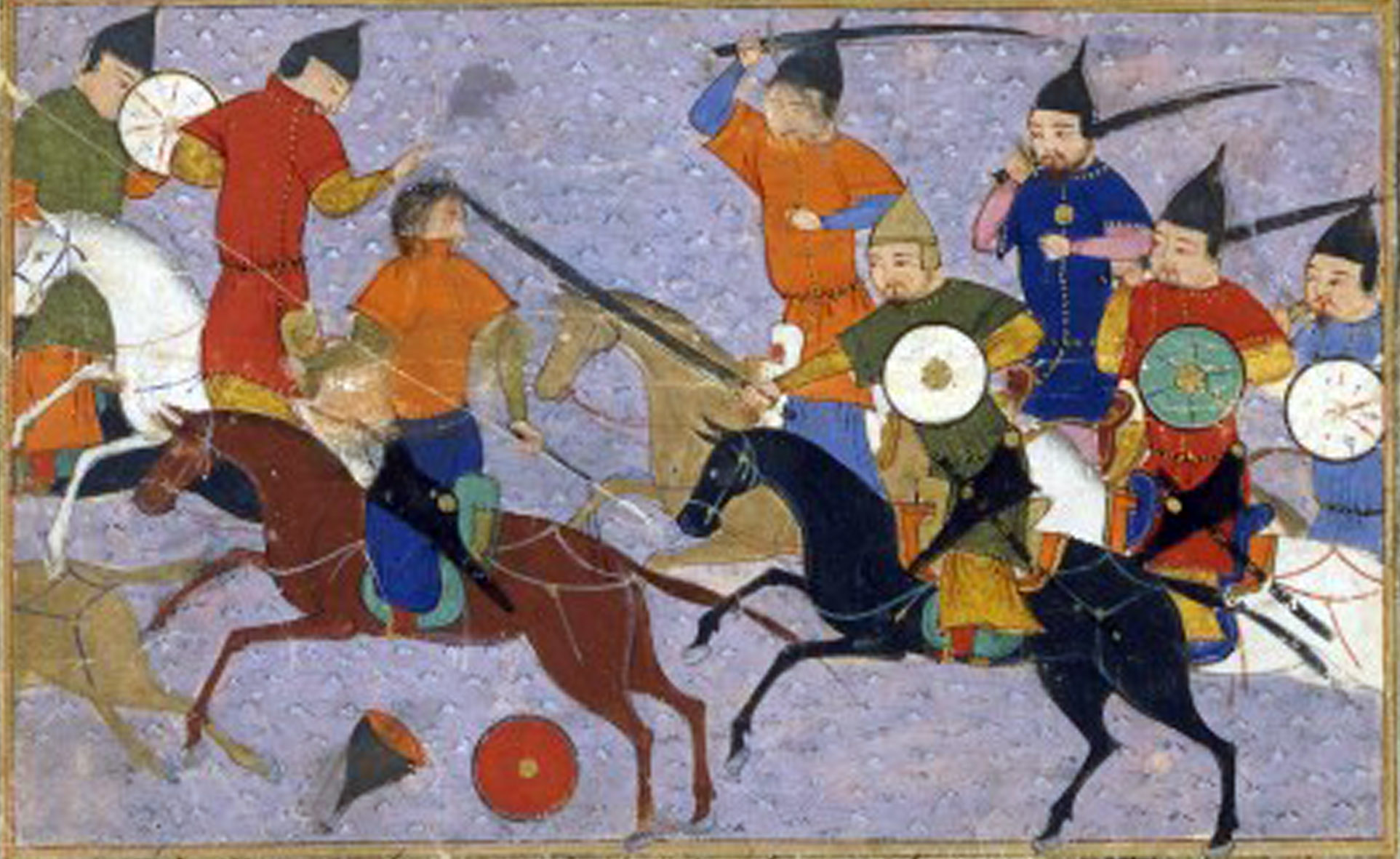
Battle between the Jin and Mongols in 1211, from the Jami' al-tawarikh

Two Mongol armies were dispatched in 1230 to capture the Jin capital of Kaifeng, then named Bianjing. The plans were to have one army approach the city from the north, while the second attacked from the south. Ögedei Khan headed the army based in Shanxi and his brother Tolui commanded the army stationed in Shaanxi. An illness incapacitated Ögedei and Tolui, and they relinquished their roles in the campaign. Ögedei later regained his health, but Tolui died the next year. Subutai led the combined Mongol forces once the two armies converged in late 1231 and early 1232. The Mongols reached the Yellow River on January 28, 1232, and began amassing around Kaifeng on February 6. They besieged the city on April 8.

The Jurchens tried to end the siege by negotiating a peace treaty. There was some progress towards an agreement in the summer of 1232, but the assassination of the Mongol diplomat Tang Qing and his entourage by the Jurchens made further talks impossible. The Jin grew desperate. They had enlisted most of the available men in the empire to either defend Kaifeng or fight against the Mongols on the frontlines. While the negotiations were ongoing, a plague was devastating the population of the city. Starvation was rampant. The supplies stored in Kaifeng were running out, even with what had been forcibly seized from people. The city's political disintegration created unfounded fears that there was an internal threat. Several residents of the city were executed on the suspicion that they were traitors.

The defense of the city did not collapse immediately. The Jin held out for months before the city fell. The Jurchen emperor was afforded the opportunity to escape in late 1232, and departed with a retinue of court officials. He left the governance of the city to the General Cui Li and reached the city of Guide in Henan on February 26, 1233, then Caizhou on August 3. The retreat of the emperor was ruinous to the morale of the soldiers defending the city. In the wake of the emperor's departure, Cui ordered the execution of those loyal to the emperor who had remained in the city. He realized that prolonging the siege was suicidal, and offered to surrender to the Mongols. Cui opened the gates of Kaifeng and the Mongols were let into the city on May 29. He was later killed outside of battle in a personal dispute, for insulting the wife of someone under his command.

The Mongols looted the city when it fell, but atypical to most sieges in the time period, they permitted trade. The richest residents of the city sold their luxury belongings to Mongol soldiers for critically needed food supplies. Male members of the royal family residing in the city were captured and executed. All imperial concubines, including the empress dowager, were captured and taken north.

== Military technology ==
Historian Herbert Franke observed in his assessment of the battle that the siege is significant for historians of military technology. Many of the details of the siege are known to historians, based on a comprehensive account of the battle compiled by a Jin official living in the besieged city. The Jurchens fired explosives, propelled by trebuchets, at the opposing army. A contemporaneous record of the battle recounts the process by which the bombs were launched. First, a soldier ignited the fuse. The rope of the trebuchet was pulled, launching the bomb into the air. The bomb produced a large explosion the moment it landed, inflicting damage that could penetrate armor. The explosion sometimes sparked a fire on the grass of the battlefield, which could burn a soldier to death, even if he survived the initial blast. The bombs were more primitive than modern explosives, and occasionally they would fail to detonate or detonated too early. Mongol soldiers counteracted the bombs by digging trenches leading up to the city, which they covered with shielding made of cowhide, to protect from the explosives fired overhead. The Jurchen official reports, in a translation provided by historian Stephen Turnbull:

Therefore the Mongol soldiers made cowhide shields to cover their approach trenches and men beneath the walls, and dug as it were niches, each large enough to contain a man, hoping that in this way the troops above would not be able to do anything about it. But someone suggested the technique of lowering the thunder crash bombs on iron chains. When these reached the trenches where the Mongols were making their dugouts, the bombs were set off, with the result that the cowhide and the attacking soldiers were all blown to bits, and not even a trace being left behind.

The infantry of the Jin were armed with fire lances. The fire lance was a spear, with a tube of gunpowder attached to it. The mixture contained, besides the gunpowder ingredients of sulfur, charcoal, and saltpeter, ground porcelain and iron filings. The flame that shot from the lance reached a distance of three meters. The heated tinder that ignited the weapon was stored in a small iron box toted by the Jurchen soldiers in battle. Once the gunpowder was consumed, the fire lance could be wielded like a normal spear, or replenished by a new tube filled with gunpowder.

The bombs and fire lances of the Jin were the only two weapons of the Jurchens that the Mongols were wary of facing. The Jurchen deployment of gunpowder was extensive, but it is not certain if the Mongols had acquired gunpowder from the Jurchens before this point. Herbert Franke maintains that gunpowder was in the arsenal of both combatants, but Turnbull believes that only the Jurchens made use of it. The Mongols loaded their catapults with large stones or bombs of gunpowder, which were fired at the Jin fortifications. The barrage inflicted casualties in the city and had a psychological impact on the soldiers operating the Jurchen trebuchets.

== Historical significance ==
The siege of Kaifeng crippled the Jin dynasty, but did not destroy it. The penultimate emperor of the dynasty, Emperor Aizong, had evaded capture, but was left destitute after the siege. He sent his diplomats to entreat the neighbouring Song Dynasty for help. They warned that the Mongols would invade the Song once the Jin fell, and requested supplies from the Song. The Song refused the offer. The Song, who had fought multiple wars against the Jin, resented the Jurchens for their conquest of northern China decades earlier. Instead of aiding the Jin, the Song allied with the Mongols. They cooperated militarily and captured the last of the cities still controlled by the Jin. In December 1233, the Mongols besieged Caizhou, where Aizong had fled to from Kaifeng. The emperor was unable to escape the town under siege, and resorted to suicide. On February 9, 1234, the Mongols broke through the defenses of Caizhou. Emperor Mo, Emperor Aizong's intended successor, resided in the same town and was killed in battle soon after. His reign lasted less than two days, from February 9 to his death on February 10. The Jin dynasty ended with the fall of Caizhou.

One year after the end of the Jin dynasty, Emperor Aizong's prediction turned out to be right, with the beginning of the Mongol conquest of the Song dynasty.

== Comparison to the Mongol treatment of other royal families ==
Historian Patricia Buckley Ebrey noted that the Mongol Yuan dynasty treated the Jurchen Wanyan royal family harshly, butchering them by the hundreds as well as the Tangut emperor of Western Xia when they defeated him earlier. However Ebrey also noted the Mongols were lenient on the Han Chinese Zhao royal family of the Southern Song explicitly unlike the Jurchens in the Jingkang incident, sparing both the Southern Song royals in the capital Hangzhou like the Emperor Gong of Song and his mother as well as sparing the civilians inside it and not sacking the city, allowing them to go about their normal business, rehiring Southern Song officials. The Mongols did not take the southern Song palace women for themselves but instead had Han Chinese artisans in Shangdu marry the palace women. The Mongol emperor Kublai Khan even granted a Mongol princess from his own Borjigin family as a wife to the surrendered Han Chinese Southern Song Emperor Gong of Song and they had a son together named Zhao Wanpu. Genghis Khan forced the Jurchen Jin dynasty to give the former Jurchen Wanyan Jin Emperor Wanyan Yongji's daughter, the Jin Jurchen Wanyan Princess of Qi (岐國公主) to Genghis as a concubine during the Battle of Zhongdu. In the siege of Kaifeng in 1233 against the Jurchens in the Jin dynasty, Mongols and Han Chinese who defected to the Mongols against the Jin slaughtered the male members of the Jin Jurchen Wanyan Imperial family and took the Jin Jurchen Wanyan royal women including the Jin concubines and Jin Jurchen Wanyan princesses to Mongolia as war booty.

== Bibliography ==
- Allsen, Thomas (1994). "The rise of the Mongolian empire and Mongolian rule in north China". In Denis C. Twitchett; Herbert Franke; John King Fairbank (eds.). The Cambridge History of China: Volume 6, Alien Regimes and Border States, 710–1368. Cambridge University Press. pp. 321–413. ISBN 978-0-521-24331-5.
- Franke, Herbert (1994). "The Chin Dynasty". In Twitchett, Denis C.; Herbert Franke; John King Fairbank (eds.). The Cambridge History of China: Volume 6, Alien Regimes and Border States, 710–1368. Cambridge University Press. pp. 215–320. ISBN 978-0-521-24331-5.
- Holcombe, Charles (2011). A History of East Asia: From the Origins of Civilization to the Twenty-First Century. Cambridge University Press. ISBN 978-0-521-51595-5.
- Lane, George (2004). Genghis Khan and Mongol Rule. Greenwood Publishing Group. ISBN 978-0-313-32528-1.
- Mote, Frederick W. (1999). Imperial China: 900–1800. Harvard University Press. ISBN 978-0-674-01212-7.
- Needham, Joseph (1987). Science and Civilisation in China: Military technology: The Gunpowder Epic, Volume 5, Part 7. Cambridge University Press. ISBN 978-0-521-30358-3.
- Turnbull, Stephen (2003). Genghis Khan and the Mongol Conquests 1190–1400. Osprey Publishing. ISBN 978-1-84176-523-5.
