= Siege of Caizhou =

Concluding battle of the Mongol–Jin War (1233–1234)

- Part of Mongol–Jin War and Jin–Song Wars
Date	December 1233 – February 9, 1234
Location	Caizhou (present-day Runan County, Henan Province, China)
Result	Mongol–Song victory
Territorial changes	Caizhou captured by the Mongol Empire

Belligerents
Jin dynasty	Mongol Empire; Southern Song dynasty

Commanders and leaders
Emperor Aizong of Jin ‡‡ Emperor Mo of Jin †	Ögedei Khan

The siege of Caizhou in 1233 and 1234 was a battle fought between the Jurchen-led Jin dynasty and the allied forces of the Mongol Empire and Southern Song dynasty. It was the last major battle in the Mongol conquest of the Jin dynasty.

== Background ==
The Jin and Mongols had fought for decades beginning in 1211, when the Mongols first invaded under the command of Genghis Khan. The Jin capital, Zhongdu (present-day Xicheng and Fengtai districts, Beijing), had been besieged in 1213, then captured by the Mongols in 1215. In the intervening years, the Jin dynasty moved its capital to Bianjing (present-day Kaifeng, Henan Province). Ögedei Khan, the successor to Genghis Khan, rose to power after his predecessor died in 1227. In 1230, the war effort against the Jin dynasty recommenced. Emperor Aizong, the Jin ruler, fled when the Mongols besieged Bianjing. On February 26, 1233, he reached Guide (present-day Shangqiu, Henan Province), and then moved on to Caizhou (present-day Runan County, Henan Province), on August 3.

== Events ==
The Mongols arrived at Caizhou in December 1233. The Southern Song dynasty had rebuffed Emperor Aizong's plea for assistance, and joined forces with the Mongols. The Southern Song dynasty ignored Emperor Aizong's warning that they would become the Mongol Empire's next target.

Emperor Aizong tried to escape, but eventually committed suicide when he realised that the likelihood of escaping from Caizhou was no longer plausible. Before his death, he had abdicated his throne to Wanyan Chenglin, a general and descendant of the Jin imperial clan, on February 9, 1234. Caizhou was breached by Mongol and Song forces on the same day, and Wanyan Chenglin died in the ensuing melee, ending a reign that spanned less than a day.

== Aftermath ==
The Jin dynasty came to a close with the fall of Caizhou. The Southern Song dynasty was eager to exploit the destruction of the Jin dynasty by annexing Henan. They did not succeed and were repelled by the Mongols.
