= 昭宗 =

昭宗 may refer to several Chinese and Vietnamese monarchs.

- Lê Chiêu Tông (1506–1526, reigned 1516–1522), Vietnamese monarch of the Lê dynasty
- Zhaozong (disambiguation), several Chinese monarchs
