= Cai Prefecture =

Historical administrative division in Henan, China

- Chinese: 蔡州
Transcriptions
Standard Mandarin
- Hanyu Pinyin: Cài Zhōu
- Wade–Giles: Ts'ai^{4} Chou^{1}

Caizhou or Cai Prefecture was a zhou (prefecture) in imperial China in modern Henan, China, seated in modern Runan County. It existed (intermittently) from 606 until 1293.

Caizhou was the location of the Siege of Caizhou, the last major battle of the Mongol conquest of the Jin dynasty, which took place in 1233.
