= Yuanguang =

Yuanguang (元光) was a Chinese era name used by several emperors of China. It may refer to:

- Yuanguang (134BC–129BC), an era name used by Emperor Wu of Han
- Yuanguang (1222–1223), an era name used by Emperor Xuanzong of Jin
