= Princess Consort Shao of Wei =

Princess Consort Shao of Wei 衛紹王后

Empress consort of the Jin dynasty
- Tenure: 1209 – 1213
- Predecessor: Empress Qinhuai
- Successor: Empress Rensheng
- Born: 1168
- Died: Unknown
- Spouse: Wanyan Yongji, Prince Shao of Wei
Posthumous name
- Princess Consort Wèi shào 衛紹王后
- Clan: Tudan (by birth); Wanyan (by marriage)
- Dynasty: Jin

Princess Consort Shao of Wei
- Traditional Chinese: 衛紹王后
- Simplified Chinese: 卫绍王后
Transcriptions
Standard Mandarin
- Hanyu Pinyin: Wèi shào wánghòu

Empress Tudan
- Traditional Chinese: 徒單皇后
- Simplified Chinese: 徒单皇后
Transcriptions
Standard Mandarin
- Hanyu Pinyin: Túdān huánghòu

Princess Consort Shao of Wei, also known as Empress Tudan, was the wife of the seventh emperor of the Jurchen-led Chinese Jin dynasty, Wanyan Yongji. After her husband was killed, she was stripped of her title and banished to Zhengzhou.

== Biography ==
Lady Tudan became Empress of Jin in 1209. When Hushahu rebelled in 1213, she moved with her husband to the region of Wei. Later in the year, her husband was killed and Wudubu ascended the throne as Emperor Xuanzong. Xuanzong demoted Wuyan Yongji to Marquis of Donghai and demoted Empress Tudan. In 1214, the Jin capital was moved to Bianjing, and the Emperor decreed that all members of Wanyan Yongji's family be imprisoned in Zhengzhou with no option to leave. It was further decreed that the family's men and women would not be permitted to marry for 19 years. In 1232, Emperor Aizong lifted the restriction on movement. By this time, the Jin could not hold Henan, and it is not known what happened to the former Empress or her descendants.

== Family ==
- Spouse: Wanyan Yongji, Prince Shao of Wei (d. 11 September 1213)
