= Empress Tudan =

Empress Tudan may refer to:

- Empress Tudan (Digunai's wife) (died 1170), wife of Digunai (Wanyan Liang)
- Princess Consort Shao of Wei (1168–?), wife of Wanyan Yongji
