= Empress Zhaode =

Empress Zhaode may refer to:

- Empress Wang (Dezong) (died 786), wife of Emperor Dezong of Tang
- Empress Mingde (Jin dynasty) (died 1152), wife of Emperor Shizong of Jin
