= Zhaozong =

- Chinese: 昭宗
- Literal meaning: Luminous Ancestor
Transcriptions
Standard Mandarin
- Hanyu Pinyin: Zhāozōng
- Wade–Giles: Chao^{1}-tsung^{1}

Zhaozong is a temple name used for several Chinese monarchs. It may refer to:

- Emperor Zhaozong of Tang (867–904, reigned 888–904), Tang dynasty emperor
- Emperor Mo of Jin (died 1234, reigned in 1234), emperor of the Jurchen-led Jin dynasty (1115–1234)
- Biligtü Khan Ayushiridara (1340–1378, reigned 1370–1378), emperor of the Northern Yuan dynasty
- Zhu Youlang (1623–1662, reigned 1646–1662), Southern Ming emperor
