= Runan County =

Runan County 汝南县 Junan
- County
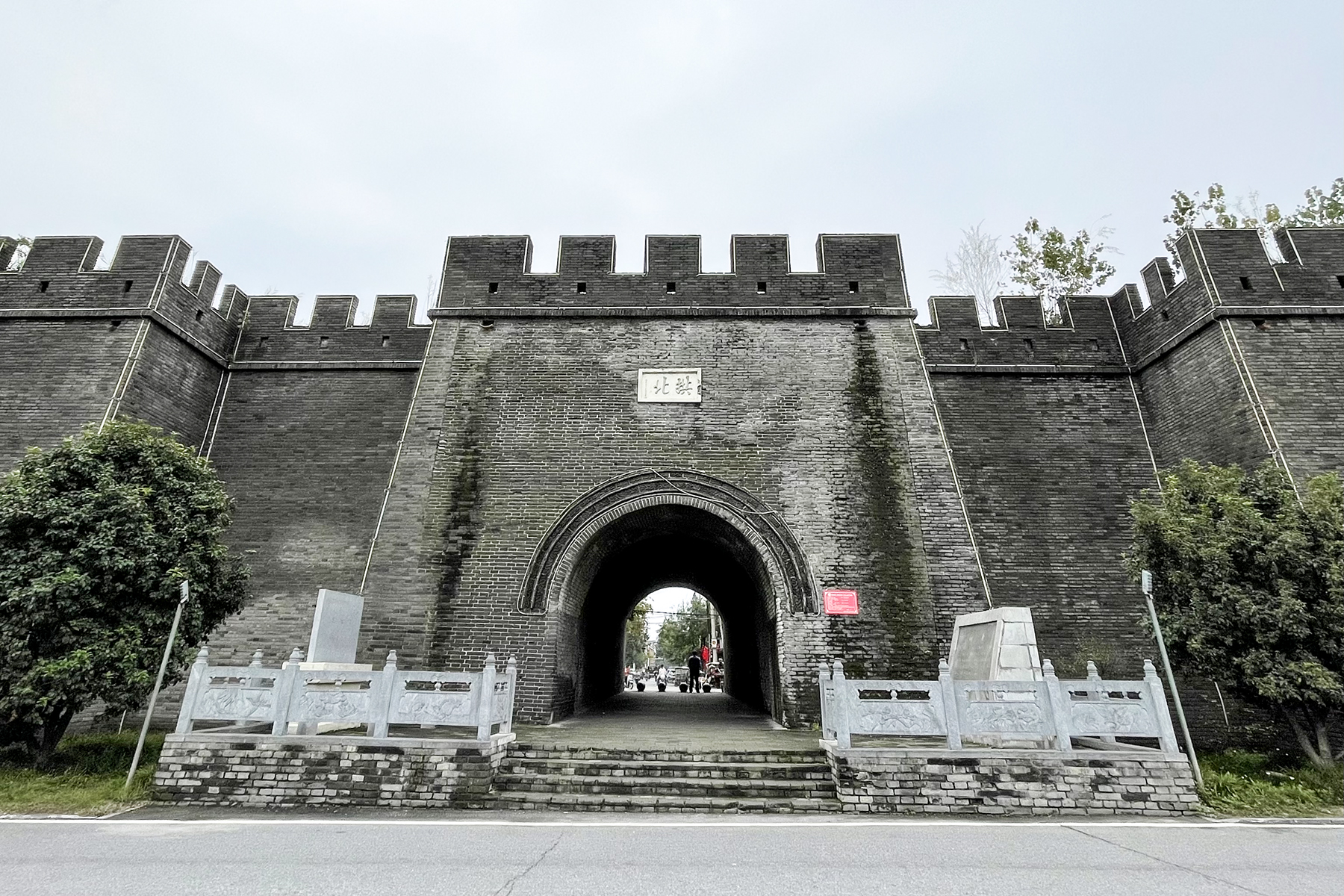
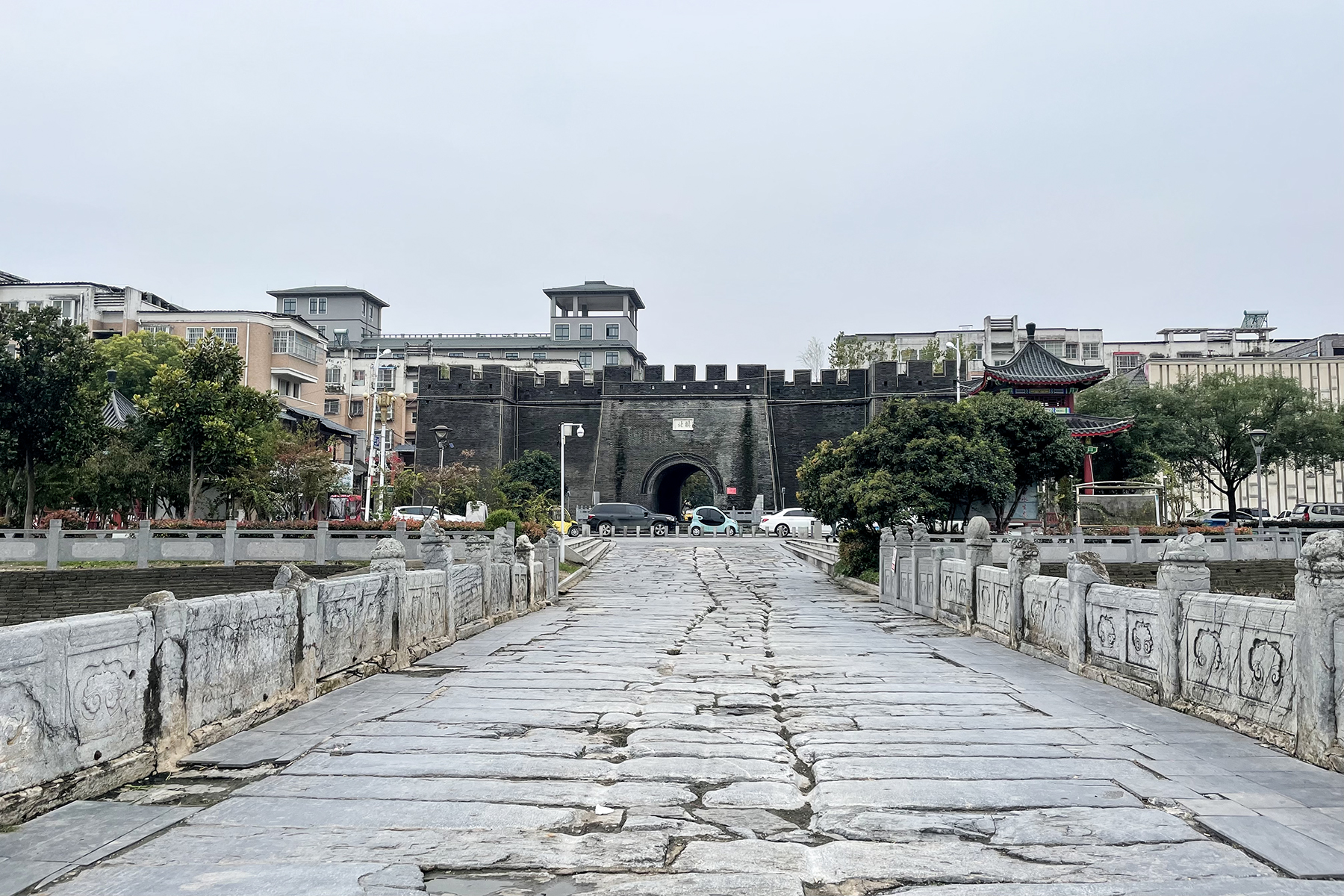
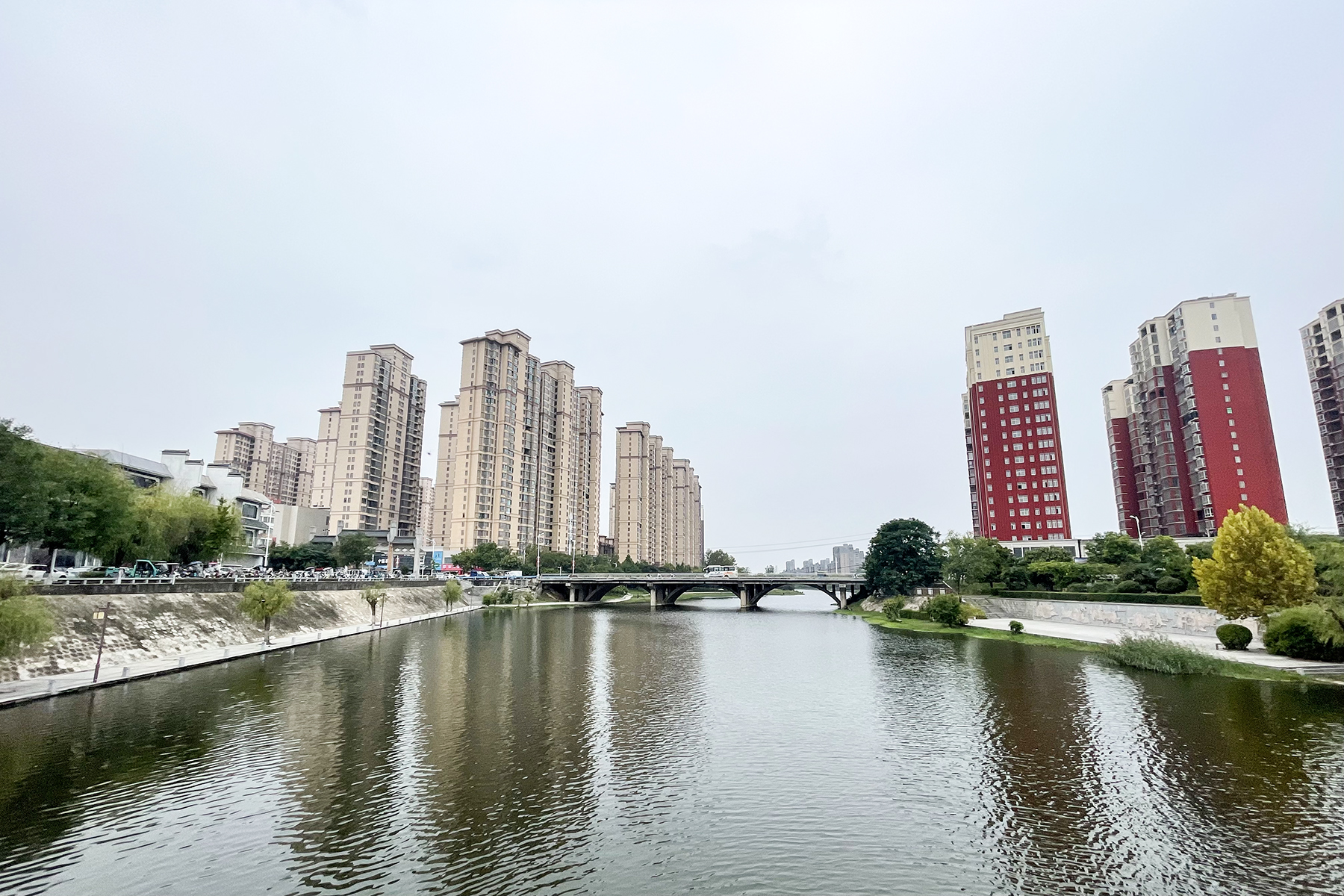
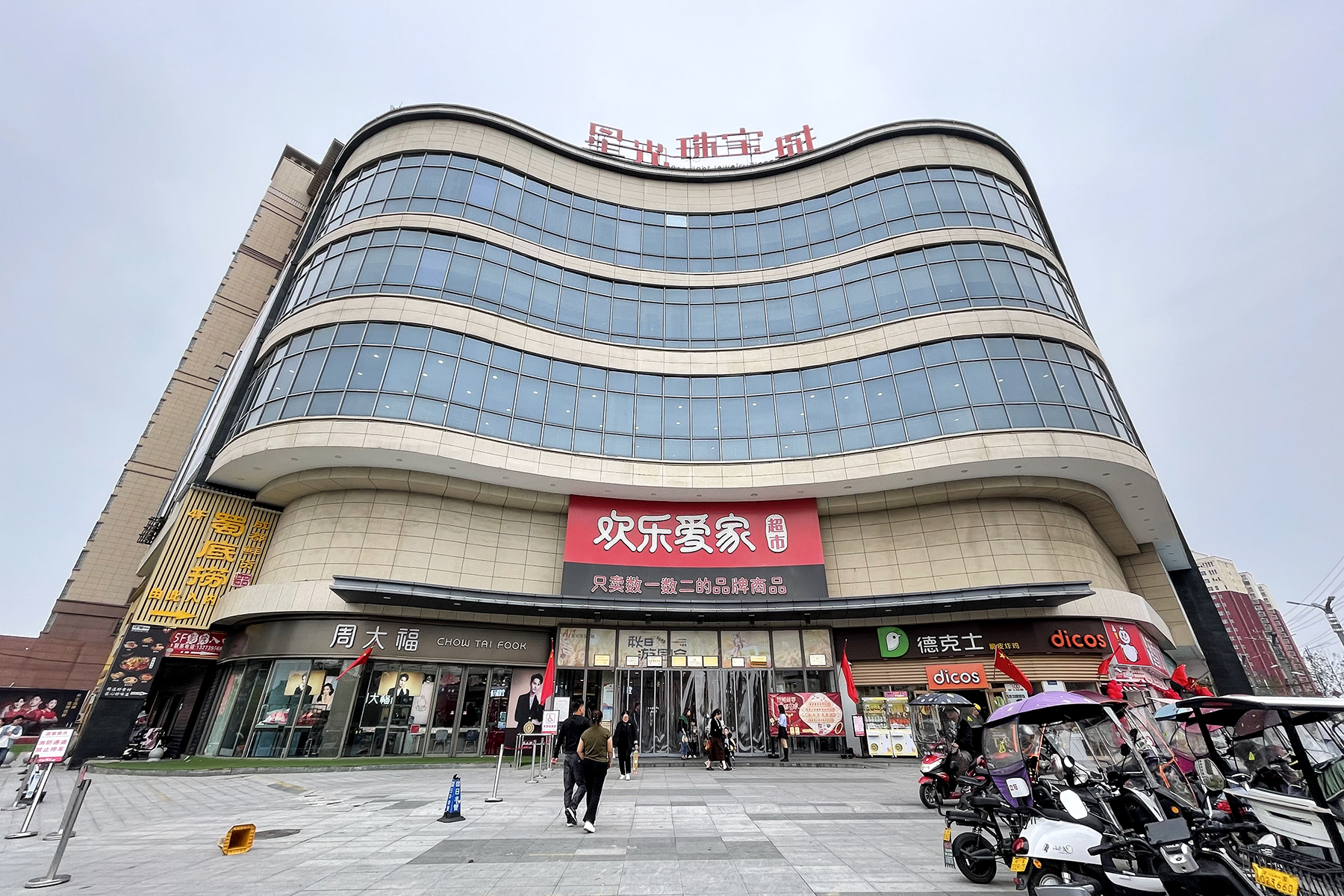
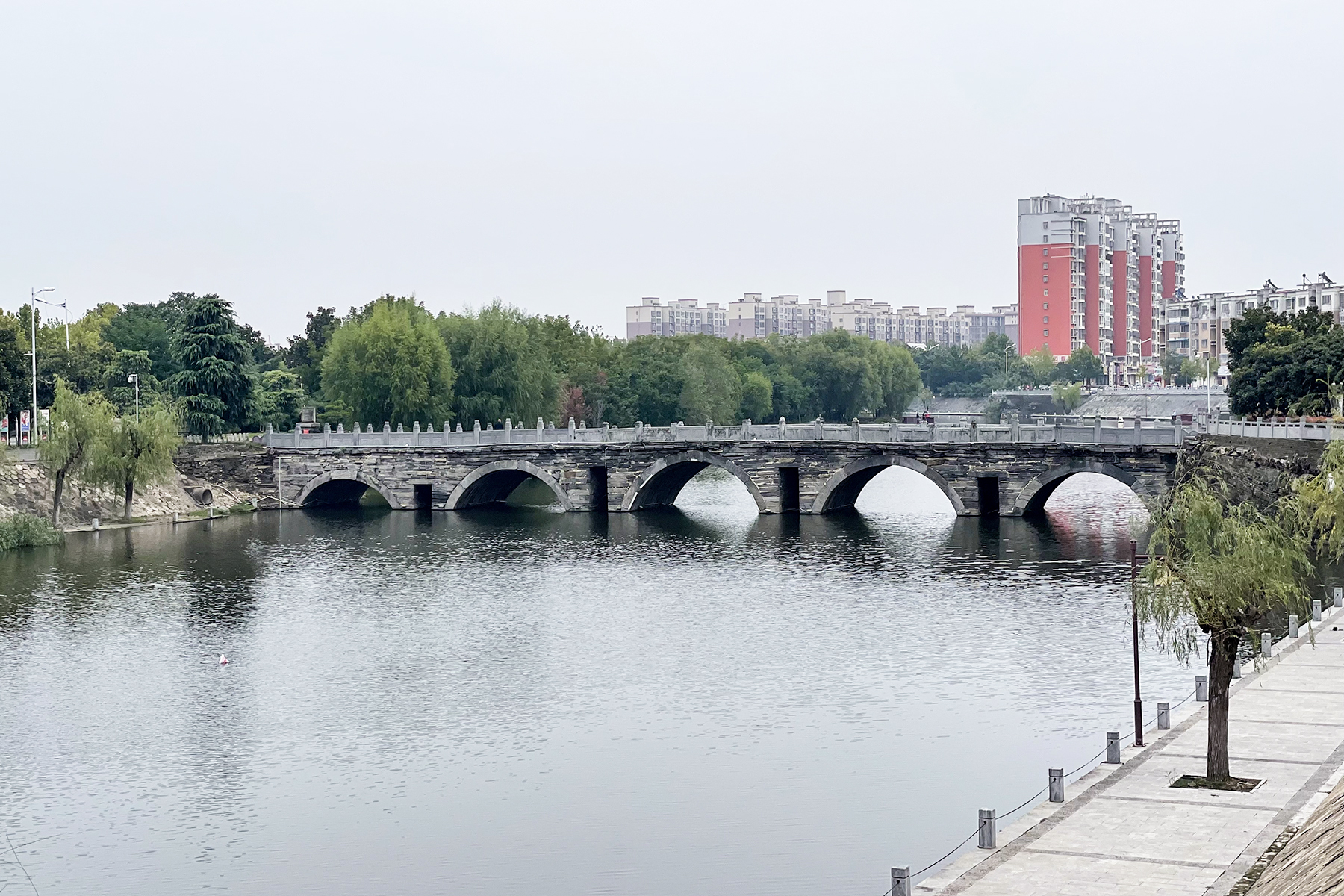
- North Gate of Runan North Gate of Runan from Runing Stone Bridge Ru River in Runan County Starlight Jewellery City, Runan Runing Stone Bridge

- Location of the seat in Henan
- Coordinates: 33°00′25″N 114°21′45″E
- Country: China
- Province: Henan
- Prefecture-level city: Zhumadian

Area
  - Total: 1,306 km^{2} (504 sq mi)

Population (2019)
  - Total: 655,300
  - Density: 501.8/km^{2} (1,300/sq mi)
- Time zone: UTC+8 (China Standard)
- Postal code: 463300

Runan County (simplified Chinese: 汝南县; traditional Chinese: 汝南縣; pinyin: Rǔnán Xiàn) is a county under the administration of the prefecture-level city of Zhumadian, in the southeast of Henan Province, China.

== History ==
In ancient times, this area was called "the middle of the world" (天中), since it was the center of government for Yu province and lay at the heart of the Nine Provinces. The Duke of Zhou (周公), the most influential statesman of the early Zhou dynasty, visited Runan many times and termed it as the center of the land. During the Han dynasty, it contributed the most officials to the central government of any commandery, and was ancestral home to the immensely influential Ru'nan Yuan clan. In former times Runan County was at various times called Ancheng County (安城县) and Ruyang County (汝阳县), and Caizhou (蔡州)., amongst others. During the Zhou dynasty (1,045-256 BC), the vassal State of Dao fell within the borders of the county.

The town was the site of a major battle, the siege of Caizhou, in the war between the Mongol Empire and Jurchen Jin dynasty. Emperor Aizong, the Jurchen ruler, had fled to Caizhou after the Jin capital of Kaifeng was captured by the Mongols. He committed suicide in Caizhou and his successor, Emperor Mo, was killed in the besieged town. The Jin dynasty ended in Runan in 1234.

== Administrative divisions ==
Today Runan County falls under the jurisdiction of the prefecture level city of Zhumadian. With a land area of 1306 square kilometres, the county is home to some 770,000 people (2002 figure). The county government is based in the town of Runing (Juning) (汝宁镇). The county of Runan was far larger in Chinese history, but had to surrender a lot of its territories to the nearby city of Zhumadian and counties in the recent centuries. This means that today's Runan is much smaller than it was.

Since Runan was famous in Chinese history, many historical relics still could be found in the county seat and within its county boundary. Notably, the Nanhai Chan Temple is famous in the Buddhist world. The site where the Duke of Zhou visited became a historical site as well.

As of 2017, this county is divided to 4 subdistricts, 12 towns and 2 townships.

=== Subdistricts ===
- Runing Subdistrict (汝宁街道)
- Sanmenzha Subdistrict (三门闸街道)
- Guta Subdistrict (古塔街道)
- Suyahu Subdistrict (宿鸭湖街道)

=== Towns ===
- Wanggang (王岗镇)
- Liangzhu (梁祝镇)
- Hexiao (和孝镇)
- Laojunmiao (老君庙镇)
- Liupen (留盆镇)
- Jinpu (金铺镇)
- Dongguanzhuan (东官庄乡)
- Changxing (常兴乡)
- Luodian (罗店乡)
- Hanzhuang (韩庄乡)
- Sanqiao (三桥乡)
- Zhanglou (张楼乡)

=== Townships ===
- Nanyudian Township (南余店乡)
- Bandian Township (板店乡)

== Climate ==
Climate data for Runan, elevation 50 m (160 ft), (1991–2020 normals, extremes 1981–present)
Month	Jan	Feb	Mar	Apr	May	Jun	Jul	Aug	Sep	Oct	Nov	Dec	Year
Record high °C (°F)	21.6 (70.9)	26.3 (79.3)	33.5 (92.3)	34.1 (93.4)	38.5 (101.3)	40.5 (104.9)	39.9 (103.8)	40.4 (104.7)	37.5 (99.5)	34.4 (93.9)	29.4 (84.9)	22.0 (71.6)	40.5 (104.9)
Mean daily maximum °C (°F)	6.6 (43.9)	10.2 (50.4)	15.5 (59.9)	21.9 (71.4)	27.3 (81.1)	31.4 (88.5)	32.3 (90.1)	31.1 (88.0)	27.6 (81.7)	22.5 (72.5)	15.3 (59.5)	8.9 (48.0)	20.9 (69.6)
Daily mean °C (°F)	1.4 (34.5)	4.5 (40.1)	9.6 (49.3)	15.7 (60.3)	21.2 (70.2)	25.7 (78.3)	27.5 (81.5)	26.3 (79.3)	21.9 (71.4)	16.3 (61.3)	9.5 (49.1)	3.4 (38.1)	15.3 (59.5)
Mean daily minimum °C (°F)	−2.5 (27.5)	0.2 (32.4)	4.7 (40.5)	10.2 (50.4)	15.7 (60.3)	20.7 (69.3)	23.8 (74.8)	22.8 (73.0)	17.7 (63.9)	11.7 (53.1)	5.0 (41.0)	−0.6 (30.9)	10.8 (51.4)
Record low °C (°F)	−15.8 (3.6)	−16.8 (1.8)	−5.2 (22.6)	−1.0 (30.2)	4.1 (39.4)	11.6 (52.9)	17.5 (63.5)	13.5 (56.3)	8.5 (47.3)	−0.3 (31.5)	−7.5 (18.5)	−14.1 (6.6)	−16.8 (1.8)
Average precipitation mm (inches)	23.2 (0.91)	25.9 (1.02)	43.7 (1.72)	57.7 (2.27)	83.1 (3.27)	139.8 (5.50)	178.4 (7.02)	142.5 (5.61)	85.5 (3.37)	58.8 (2.31)	41.4 (1.63)	19.2 (0.76)	899.2 (35.39)
Average precipitation days (≥ 0.1 mm)	5.8	6.6	7.5	7.5	9.9	8.6	11.3	10.8	8.7	7.7	7.1	5.2	96.7
Average snowy days	4.6	3.2	1.3	0	0	0	0	0	0	0	0.9	2.0	12
Average relative humidity (%)	73	72	72	74	73	72	82	84	80	75	75	72	75
Mean monthly sunshine hours	113.2	118.8	150.3	180.7	188.3	173.8	181.7	172.3	147.0	143.2	128.9	120.8	1,819
Percentage possible sunshine	36	38	40	46	44	41	42	42	40	41	42	39	41
Source: China Meteorological Administration all-time January high
