= Empress Rensheng =

Empress Rensheng 仁聖皇后

Empress consort of the Jin Dynasty
- Tenure: 1214 – 1224
- Predecessor: Princess Consort Shao of Wei

Empress dowager of the Jin Dynasty
- Tenure: 1224 – 1233
- Born: Zhongdu, Jin dynasty
- Spouse: Emperor Xuanzong of Jin
Posthumous name
- None
- Clan: Wang (by birth); Wendun (conferred); Wanyan (by marriage)
- Dynasty: Jin
- Father: Wang Yanchang
- Mother: Lady Ma

Empress Rensheng
- Traditional Chinese: 仁聖皇后
- Simplified Chinese: 仁圣皇后
Transcriptions
Standard Mandarin
- Hanyu Pinyin: Rénshèng huánghòu

Empress Rensheng of the Wang clan, also known simply as Empress Wang, was the wife of the eighth emperor of the Jurchen-led Jin dynasty of China, Emperor Xuanzong. She was captured and taken north by Mongol forces during the siege of Bianjing.

== Background ==
Lady Wang was born in Zhongdu to the commoner Wang Yanchang and a lady of the Ma clan. The History of Jin records that, before the birth of Lady Wang and her elder sister, her father dreamt of two jade combs that turned into the moon. After he died, lingzhi grew all over his coffin.

In 1196, Wudubu of the imperial clan was bestowed the title of Prince of Yi (翼王), and Emperor Zhangzong, his half-brother, instructed all princes to choose women from commoner families for their harems. Wudubu thus selected Lady Wang and a Lady Pang for his harem, and, on seeing that Lady Wang's elder sister was very beautiful, he selected her as well.

== Xuanzong's reign ==
When Wudubu ascended the throne as Emperor Xuanzong in 1213, Lady Wang was given the title of Consort Yuan and her sister Consort Shu. In 1214, Xuanzong bestowed on her the surname Wendun (温敦氏), instated her as empress, and promoted her sister to Consort Yuan. He also conferred titles on their great-grandparents, grandparents, and parents in the male line. On the day that the Wang sisters received their titles, a strong wind caused a haze, and yellow air filled the sky. At this time, Empress Rensheng had a dream where she was followed by thousands of beggars. Diviners told her, 'the empress is the mother of all under heaven. The common people are poor, to whom can they complain of this?' The empress thus ordered porridge and medicine to be distributed in the capital.

The History of Jin reports two stories about a Consort Zheng, who was reportedly the mother of Xuanzong's eldest son and his original empress. One story describes how shortly after Xuanzong's ascension, he decreed that Lady Wang had served admirably and should become empress instead of Consort Zheng. Another story is that Consort Zheng lost the Emperor's favour from the moment the Wang sisters entered the palace, and she left to become a Buddhist nun, allowing Lady Wang to be established as empress. These events were plotted by Lady Wang's elder sister.

Lady Wang had no children, so she raised her sister's son, Ningjiasu, as her own child.

== Aizong's reign ==
In 1224, Xuanzong died and was succeeded by Ningjiasu as Emperor Aizong, who gave her the title of Empress Dowager (皇太后) and named her residence rensheng (仁聖). Her sister was also elevated to Empress Dowager with the residence name cisheng (慈聖). Empress Dowager Cisheng died in 1231.

=== Fall of Jin ===
As the Jin lost ground to the Mongols, there was a famine in Henan in 1232. Subutai's forces surrounded Bianjing, and plague broke out. The empress dowager personally witnessed people starving and dying of plague, with the number of dead reaching more than a million. In late 1232, Aizong planned to escape the capital for Guide (歸德, modern Shangqiu). Empress Dowager Rensheng gathered gold ingots and precious objects, which she gave to the loyal soldiers of the emperor's escort. The same night, the emperor, empress, and Consort Rou of the Peiman clan left the palace on horseback. When they reached Chenliu, it was already in flames, and as it was suspected that Mongol soldiers were nearby, the party did not dare enter the city. When Bianjing fell in the middle of 1233, Empress Dowager Rensheng and all imperial concubines were imprisoned and taken north. It is not known what became of her after this.

== Family ==
- Father: Wang Yanchang (王彦昌)
- Mother: Lady Bianguo of the Ma clan (汴国夫人马氏)
- Elder sister: Empress Dowager Cisheng (d. 1231), posthumous name Empress Minghui
  - Nephew: Emperor Aizong of Jin (25 September 1198 – 9 February 1234)
