= Liangzhu, Henan =

Liangzhu 梁祝镇
- Town
- Location in Henan
- Coordinates: 32°46′50″N 114°21′34″E
- Country: People's Republic of China
- Province: Henan
- Prefecture-level city: Zhumadian
- County: Runan
- Elevation: 74 m (243 ft)
- Time zone: UTC+8 (China Standard)

Liangzhu (Chinese: 梁祝; pinyin: Liángzhù) is a town in Runan County, in southeastern Henan province, China, serviced by Henan Provincial Highway 219 (S219). As of 2011, it has 2 residential communities (社区) and 16 villages under its administration.

== See also ==
- List of township-level divisions of Henan
