= Wanyan Yungong =

Jurchen prince of Jin Dynasty (1146–1185)

Wanyan Yungong (Chinese: 完顏允恭; 1146－1185), Jurchen name Hutuwa (Chinese: 胡土瓦), was an imperial prince of China's Jurchen-led Jin dynasty. He was the son of the Emperor Shizong and Empress Mingde. He was the father of the Emperor Zhangzong and Emperor Xuanzong.

In May 1162, he became the Crown Prince. In the first month of the eighth year of Emperor Shizong's reign, his title was changed back. In June of the 25th year of Shizong, the prince died of illness in Chenghua Hall. After hearing the news, Shizong was very sad and accorded him the posthumous name Crown Prince Xuanxiao (宣孝太子).

After his eldest son (Emperor Zhangzong) became emperor, he was honored with the temple name Xianzong (顯宗) and the posthumous name Emperor Tidao Hongren Yingwen Ruide Guangxiao (體道弘仁英文睿德光孝皇帝).

== Family ==
Parents

- Father: Emperor Shizong of Jin
- Mother: Lady Wulinda (烏林荅氏), posthumously honoured as Empress Mingde (明德皇后)

Wives

- Empress Xiaoyi (孝懿皇后; 1147–1191) of the Tudan clan (徒單氏)
  - Emperor Zhangzong of Jin (31 August 1168 – 29 December 1208), personal name Madage(麻達葛), sinicized name Wanyan Jing (完顏璟)
- Empress Zhaosheng, of the Liu clan (昭聖皇后劉氏)
  - Emperor Xuanzong of Jin (18 April 1163 – 14 January 1224), personal name Wudubu,(吾睹補), sinicized names Wanyan Xun (完顏珣)
- Lady Tian (田氏)
  - Chengqing(承慶), sinicized name Wanyan Cong(完顏琮), Prince Huizhuang of Yun (鄆莊惠王)
  - Huandu'(桓篤), sinicized name Wanyan Gui' (顏瑰), Prince Wenjing of Ying (瀛文敬王)
  - Wulibu (吾里不), sinicized name Wanyan Zan', Prince of Huo (霍王完顏瓚)
- Lady Wang (王氏)
  - Moulianghu (謀良), sinicized name Wanyan Jie (完顏玠), Prince Mindao of Wen (溫悼敏王)
- Unknown:
  - Princess Zhangguo of Ye (邺国长公主), married Wugulun Yi (乌古论谊)
  - Princess Guo of Yi (沂国公主)
  - Princess Zhangguo of Xing (邢国长公主), married Pusan Kui (仆散揆) of the Pusan clan (仆散氏)
  - Princess Zhangguo of Sheng (升国长公主), married Pucha Cibu of the Pucha clan (蒲察辞不失)
  - Princess Jingguo (景国公主), married Pucha Cibu of the Pucha clan (蒲察辞不失)
  - Princess Daoguo (道国公主), married Pucha Cibu of the Pucha clan (蒲察辞不失)
