= Emperor Shizong of Jin =

Emperor of Jin China from 1161 to 1189

Emperor Shizong of Jin 金世宗
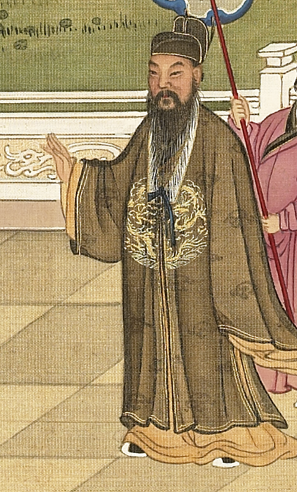
- Depiction of Shizong from the Record of Virtuous and Sagacious Rulers by Chen Shiguan, 18th century

Emperor of the Jin dynasty
- Reign: 27 October 1161 – 20 January 1189
- Predecessor: Wanyan Liang
- Successor: Emperor Zhangzong
- Born: 29 March 1123
- Died: 20 January 1189 (aged 65)
- Burial: Xing Mausoleum (興陵, in present-day Fangshan District, Beijing)
- Spouse: Empress Mingde others
- Issue: Wanyan Yungong; Wanyan Yongji others
Names
- Sinicised name: Wanyan Xiu (完顔褎), later Wanyan Yong (完顔雍); Jurchen name: Wulu (烏祿)
Era name and dates
- Dading (大定): 1161–1189
Posthumous name
- Emperor Guangtian Yuyun Wende Wugong Shengming Renxiao (光天興運文德武功聖明仁孝皇帝)
Temple name
- Shizong (世宗)
- House: Wanyan
- Dynasty: Jin
- Father: Wanyan Zongyao
- Mother: Lady Li

Emperor Shizong of Jin
- Chinese: 金世宗
Transcriptions
Standard Mandarin
- Hanyu Pinyin: Jīn Shìzōng

Wulu
- Traditional Chinese: 烏祿
- Simplified Chinese: 乌禄
Transcriptions
Standard Mandarin
- Hanyu Pinyin: Wūlù

Wanyan Yong
- Traditional Chinese: 完顏雍
- Simplified Chinese: 完颜雍
Transcriptions
Standard Mandarin
- Hanyu Pinyin: Wányán Yōng

Wanyan Xiu
- Traditional Chinese: 完顏褎
- Simplified Chinese: 完颜褎
Transcriptions
Standard Mandarin
- Hanyu Pinyin: Wányán Xiù

Emperor Shizong of Jin (29 March 1123 – 20 January 1189), personal name Wulu, sinicised name Wanyan Yong (originally Wanyan Xiu), was the fifth emperor of the Jurchen-led Jin dynasty of China. Ruling from 1161 to 1189 under the era name "Dading", Emperor Shizong's reign was the longest and most stable among the Jin emperors.

== Early life ==
Wulu was a grandson of Aguda (Emperor Taizu), the founding emperor of the Jin dynasty. His father was Eliduo (訛里朵; also known as Wanyan Zongyao, 完顏宗堯), Aguda's third son and a famous general in the early Jin dynasty. As Eliduo died when Wulu was just 12 years old, the latter grew up under the influence of his mother, who had come from a sinicised Balhae gentry family from Liaoyang. After her husband's death, Wulu's mother preferred to become a nun instead of remarrying one of her husband's relatives, as was the Jurchen custom. Due to his mother and her relatives, Wulu received a Han Chinese-style education and acquired good knowledge of the Chinese classics.

Wulu is said to have also been greatly influenced by the wife he had before becoming emperor. She was from the Wulinda (烏林荅) clan. She advised Wulu to be patient and to pretend to be loyal to his cousin, the emperor Digunai. Digunai admired Lady Wulinda so he summoned her to his inner court in 1151, but she committed suicide. Her death resulted in a deep enmity between Wulu and Digunai.

In 1161, when Digunai invaded the Southern Song dynasty to unify China under the Jin dynasty's rule, he also sent agents to assassinate many of his own relatives and thus to cement his power within the imperial clan. Wulu, who was on the hit list, started a rebellion against the emperor. The rebellion was supported by many Jurchen officers and aristocrats who were dissatisfied with Digunai's policy of cultural sinicisation and administrative centralisation, and the human cost of the emperor's southern adventure. The first military officer to support the rebellion was Wanyan Mouyan (完顏謀衍). Digunai lost the Battle of Caishi against the Song dynasty and was assassinated by his own disaffected officers. Wulu was able to become the new emperor without having to struggle against Digunai whose title he demoted down to Prince Yang of Hailing.

== Reign ==
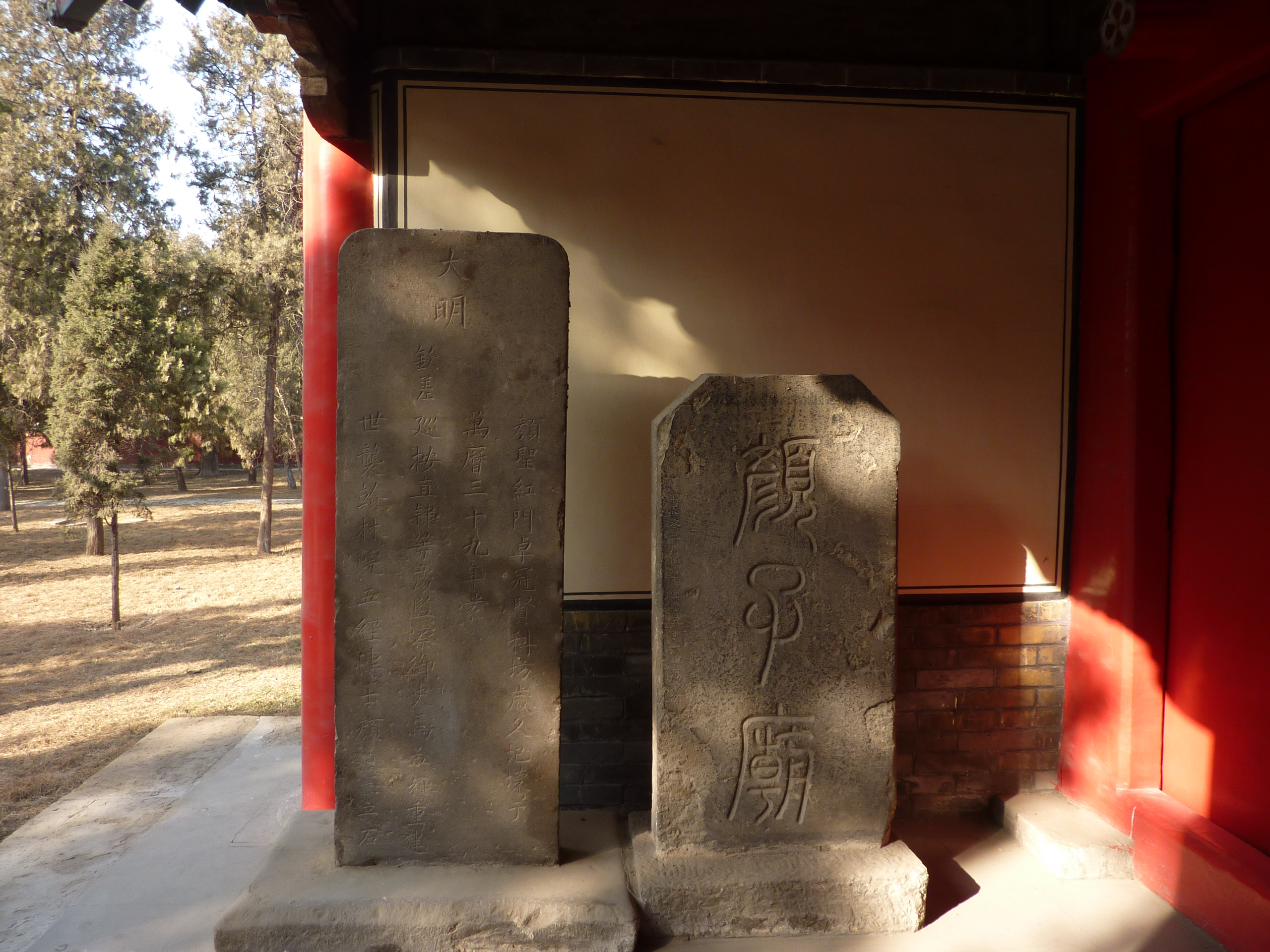
Yan Zi Miao (顏子廟) tablet (right) in the Temple of Yan, Qufu, installed in the 24th year of the Dading era (1184)

Once on the throne, Wulu – who is historically known as Emperor Shizong – abandoned his predecessor's plan for invading the Southern Song dynasty, and abolished his domestic sinicisation policies. Although conversant with Han Chinese culture himself, Emperor Shizong thought that the Jurchens' strength was in maintaining their "simple and sincere", culture, and would often attribute Digunai's defeat to the latter's wholesale abandonment of it. He was not opposed to Chinese culture per se – in fact, he once claimed that the "natural and honest" Jurchen way of life was much like what the ancient Chinese sages taught – but he thought that merely reading the Chinese classics without putting their ideas into practice was counterproductive.

During Emperor Shizong's reign, he confiscated large areas of unused land and land that had been grabbed by a few large Jurchen landowners, and redistributed it to the Jurchen settlers in northern China. Still, many Jurchens preferred not to work their land plots, but lease them to Han Chinese farmers, and engage in heavy drinking instead. The emperor criticised his people for losing their martial spirit and military skills, such as archery and riding. To give an example to his subjects, Emperor Shizong made hunting an annual royal activity in 1162, and until 1188 he went hunting almost every autumn and winter. He also enjoyed archery and ball games.

As part of his promotion of Jurchen culture and the Jurchen language, soon after ascending the throne, Emperor Shizong started a programme of translating Chinese classics into Jurchen. The Jurchen version of the Classic of History was the first to be published; by the end of the Dading era, many other Chinese classics had become available in Jurchen.

Early in his reign, Emperor Shizong chose 3,000 Jurchen men to study the Jurchen language. In 1173, the state started offering jinshi degrees in Jurchen, opened the Jurchen Imperial Academy (女真國子學) in the capital and local schools in all the circuits of the empire. It is thought by modern scholars that the purpose of offering the jinshi examinations in Jurchen was more to promote Jurchen scholarship than to recruit more Jurchen for the state service, as most of the Jurchen jinshi degree holders ended up working as teachers of the Jurchen language and of the Chinese classics in Jurchen translation.

Emperor Shizong required that, when dealing with Jurchen speakers, government officials respond in Jurchen. In 1174, even the imperial guards were told to learn Jurchen, and not to speak in Chinese; in 1183, one thousand copies of the Jurchen edition of the Classic of Filial Piety were distributed to them for their edification.

Poor Jurchen families in the southern Routes (Daming and Shandong) Battalion and Company households tried to live the lifestyle of wealthy Jurchen families and avoid doing farming work by selling their own Jurchen daughters into slavery and renting their land to Han tenants. The Wealthy Jurchens feasted and drank and wore damask and silk. The History of Jin (Jinshi) says that Emperor Shizong of Jin took note and attempted to halt these things in 1181.

As one of the ways of restoring Jurchen traditions, Emperor Shizong prohibited servants and slaves from wearing silk, and in 1188 he prohibited Jurchens in general from wearing Han Chinese clothes.

Emperor Shizong and his successor, Emperor Zhangzong, were described as believers in both Buddhism and Taoism. In 1187, Emperor Shizong invited Wang Chuyi, a disciple of Wang Chongyang (the founder of the Quanzhen School of Taoism), to preach in his palace. According to some sources, another of Wang Chongyang's disciples, Qiu Chuji, was invited as well. The emperor requested the presence of Wang Chuyi at his deathbed.

== Modern evaluation ==
Modern scholars feel that Emperor Shizong's efforts to maintain and revive the Jurchen language and culture were not particularly efficacious. The language lacked native literature, and his translations of Chinese works into Jurchen were helping to bring Chinese ideas and values into Jurchens' minds. In fact, the emperor himself once said that the Jurchen language was "inferior to Chinese", and could not even match Khitan. Outside of the old Jurchen lands in Manchuria, people did not see the utility of speaking the "dying" and "inferior" language, and Emperor Shizong himself was wondering if his descendants would criticize him for his attempts to force people to use it.

Emperor Shizong's attempts to preserve the Jurchens' identity as hunters, too, were conflicting with his drive to improve their livelihood by making them into good farmers. Nonetheless, people generally admired his love of peace, his promotion of learning and care of people's well-being; traditionally, his era was called a "miniature of Yao and Shun", referring to the legendary ancient sage kings.

== Family ==
Parents:

- Father: Eliduo (訛里朵), sinicised name Wanyan Zongyao (完顏宗堯), posthumously honoured as Emperor Ruizong (金睿宗)
- Mother: Lady Li (李氏), posthumously honoured as Empress Zhenyi (貞懿皇后)

Wives

- Empress Mingde, of the Wulinda clan (明德皇后烏林荅氏, d. 1152)
  - Wanyan Yungong, Emperor Xianzong (金顯宗 完顏允恭, 1146 – 1185), 1st son
  - Wanyan Shunian, Prince of Zhao (趙王 完顏孰輦), 2nd son
  - Wanyan Xielu, Prince of Yue(越王完顏斜魯), 3rd son
  - Princess of Yu (豫國公主), 1st daughter
    - Married Wugulun Yuanzhong, Duke of Ren (任國公 烏古論元忠), grandson of Emperor Taizu
- Empress Guangxian, of the Li clan (光獻皇后李氏, d. 1181)
  - Wanyan Yongdao, Prince La of Zheng (鄭剌王 完顏永蹈, d. 1193), 6th son
  - Wanyan Yongji, Prince Shao of Wei (衛紹王 完顏永濟, d.11 September 1213), 7th son
  - Wanyan Yongde, Prince of Lu (潞王 完顏永德), 8th son
  - Princess of Han (韓國公主), 2nd daughter
    - married Pusan Kui (僕散揆)
- First Consort, of the Zhang clan (元妃 張氏)
  - Wanyan Yongzhong, Prince Li of Gao (鎬厲王 完顏永中, d. 1194), 4th son
  - Wanyan Yonggong, Prince Zhongjian of Yue (越忠簡王 完顏永功, 1154 – 1221), 5th son
- Worthy Consort, of the Shimo clan (石抺氏)
- Virtuous Consort, of the Tushan clan (德妃 徒單氏)
- Consort Rou, of the Da clan (柔妃 大氏)
- Zhaoyi, of the Liang clan (昭儀 梁氏)
  - Wanyan Yongcheng, Prince Zhongxian of Yu (豫忠獻王 完顏永成, d. 1204), 9th son
- Cairen, of the Shimo clan (才人 石抹氏)
  - Wanyan Yongsheng, Prince of Kui (夔王 完顏永升, d. 1213), 10th son
- Unknown:
  - Princess Supreme of Yan (兗國大長公主), 3rd daughter
    - married Pucha Husha (蒲察胡沙)
  - Princess of Wu (吳國公主), 4th daughter
    - married Tangkuo Gong (唐括貢)
  - Princess of Shu (蜀國公主), 5th daughter
    - married Tangkuo Ding (唐括鼎)
  - Princess of Wan (宛國公主), 7th daughter
    - married Wulinda Fu (烏林荅復)
  - Princess of Xi (息國公主)
    - married Tushan Gongbi (徒單公弼)
  - Princess of Cao (曹國公主)
  - Princess of Wei (衛國公主)
    - married Pucha Pusulie (蒲察蒲速烈)
  - Unnamed Princess, 14th daughter
    - married Heshilie Zhushennu (紇石烈諸神奴)
  - Princess of Ze (澤國公主), personal name Changle (長樂)
    - married Puladu (蒲剌睹)
