= Emperor Aizong of Jin =

Emperor of Jin from 1224 to 1234

Emperor Aizong of Jin 金哀宗

Emperor of the Jin dynasty
- Reign: 15 January 1224 – 9 February 1234
- Predecessor: Emperor Xuanzong
- Successor: Emperor Mo
- Born: 25 September 1183
- Died: 9 February 1234 (aged 50); Caizhou (in present-day Runan County, Henan, China)
- Spouse: Empress Tushan
Names
- Sinicized name: Wanyan Shouli (完顏守禮), later Wanyan Shouxu (完顏守緒); Jurchen name: Ningjiasu (寧甲速)
Era dates
- Zhengda (正大): 1224–1232; Kaixing (開興): 1232; Tianxing (天興): 1232–1234
Posthumous name
- Emperor Zhuang (莊皇帝); Emperor Min (閔皇帝)
Temple name
- Aizong (哀宗) (official); Zhuangzong (莊宗) (private); Minzong (閔宗) (private); Yizong (義宗) (private)
- House: Wanyan
- Dynasty: Jin
- Father: Emperor Xuanzong
- Mother: Empress Minghui

Chinese name
- Chinese: 金哀宗
- Literal meaning: "Mournful Ancestor of the Jin"
Transcriptions
Standard Mandarin
- Hanyu Pinyin: Jīn Āizōng

Ningjiasu
- Traditional Chinese: 寧甲速
- Simplified Chinese: 宁甲速
Transcriptions
Standard Mandarin
- Hanyu Pinyin: Níngjiǎsù

Wanyan Shouxu
- Traditional Chinese: 完顏守緒
- Simplified Chinese: 完颜守绪
Transcriptions
Standard Mandarin
- Hanyu Pinyin: Wányán Shǒuxù

Wanyan Shouli
- Traditional Chinese: 完顏守禮
- Simplified Chinese: 完颜守礼
Transcriptions
Standard Mandarin
- Hanyu Pinyin: Wányán Shóulǐ

Emperor Aizong of Jin (25 September 1198 – 9 February 1234), personal name Ningjiasu, sinicized names Wanyan Shouxu and Wanyan Shouli, was the ninth emperor of the Jurchen-led Jin dynasty of China. He was considered an able emperor who made several reforms beneficial to the Jin dynasty, such as the removal of corrupt officials and the introduction of more lenient tax laws. He also ended the wars against the Southern Song dynasty, and canceled the Treaty of Shaoxing, free of obligation, instead focusing the Jin dynasty's military resources on resisting the Mongol invasion. Despite his efforts, the Jin dynasty, already weakened by the flawed policies of his predecessors, eventually fell to the Mongol Empire. He escaped to Caizhou when the Mongols besieged Bianjing, the Jin capital (coincidentally, the former Song capital), in 1232. When Caizhou also came under Mongol attack in 1234, he passed the throne to his army marshal Wanyan Chenglin and then committed suicide.

== Early life ==
Ningjiasu was the third son of Emperor Xuanzong. His mother was Emperor Xuanzong's concubine, Lady Wang (王氏), who was posthumously honored as "Empress Minghui" (明惠皇后). After Emperor Xuanzong ascended the throne, he gave the title "Prince of Sui" (遂王) to Ningjiasu. Emperor Xuanzong's eldest son and heir apparent, Wanyan Shouzhong (完顏守忠), as well as Wanyan Shouzhong's son, both died prematurely, so in 1216 Emperor Xuanzong declared Ningjiasu, his next oldest surviving son, as his heir apparent. Ningjiasu chose for himself the sinicized name "Shouxu" (守緒).

When Emperor Xuanzong died in January 1224, Wanyan Shouxu inherited the throne and became historically known as Emperor Aizong.

== Reign ==
In 1224, he instated his consort Lady Tushan (徒單氏) as his empress consort. During his reign, Emperor Aizong tried to revive the Jin dynasty, which was on the verge of collapse due to his predecessors' policies. He ended the wars against the Southern Song dynasty, canceled the Treaty of Shaoxing, free of obligation, reconciled with the Jin dynasty's former ally Western Xia, instituted internal reforms in his administration, eliminated corrupt and incompetent officials, and promoted military generals who resisted the Mongol invasion and recovered lost territories from the Mongols. However, the Mongol Empire had become a formidable power by then, and in 1227, it completely conquered Western Xia and concentrated its attacks on the Jin dynasty.

In 1232, the Mongols inflicted a crushing defeat on Jin forces at the Battle of Sanfengshan (三峯山之戰) and destroyed the bulk of the Jin armed forces. They pressed on and besieged the Jin capital, Bianjing (汴京; present-day Kaifeng, Henan Province). The defending Jin forces put up fierce resistance. At the same time, a plague hit Bianjing; around every 50 days, over 900,000 dead bodies had to be transported out of the city, excluding the dead bodies of those who were too poor to be given a proper burial.

Towards the end of 1232, Emperor Aizong fled Bianjing with an escort paid generously by the empress dowager. He crossed the Yellow River, and sought shelter in Guide (歸德; present-day Shangqiu, Henan Province), before settling down in Caizhou (蔡州; present-day Runan County, Henan Province). The Han Chinese general Shi Tianze led troops to pursue Emperor Aizong as he retreated, and destroyed an 80,000-strong Jin army led by Wanyan Chengyi (完顏承裔) at Pucheng (蒲城). In the eighth month of 1233, the Mongols asked their ally, the Southern Song dynasty, to attack the Jin dynasty at Tangzhou (唐州; present-day Tanghe County, Henan Province). Emperor Aizong sought to make peace with the Southern Song dynasty, so he sent an emissary to warn them that if the Mongols conquered the Jin dynasty, they would attack Southern Song next. The Southern Song dynasty ignored the warning.

On 9 February 1234, the allied forces of the Mongols and Southern Song dynasty besieged Caizhou and conquered the city.

=== Death ===
Emperor Aizong sensed that his doom was near but did not want to be remembered by history as the last emperor of the Jin dynasty, so he announced his decision to abdicate and pass his throne to Wanyan Chenglin (Wanyan Chengyi's brother). Wanyan Chenglin refused to accept, but the emperor insisted and said, "I am fat and unable to ride on horseback into battle. If the city falls, it will be difficult for me to escape on horseback. You, on the other hand, are physically fit and strong. Moreover, you are a talented military leader. If you manage to escape, you can ensure that the dynasty lives on, and make a comeback in the future. This is my wish." Wanyan Chenglin reluctantly accepted. Aizong later committed suicide by hanging himself. When Wanyan Chenglin received news of Emperor Aizong's death, he gathered his followers and held a ceremony to mourn the emperor and posthumously honor him with the temple name "Aizong". By the time the ceremony ended, Caizhou had been overrun by Mongol forces. Wanyan Chenglin was killed in action. His death marked the end of the Jin dynasty.

=== Remains ===
Emperor Aizong's remains were divided between the Mongol general Taghachar and the Song general Meng Gong (孟珙). Taghachar obtained Emperor Aizong's hands while the rest of the emperor's remains were taken back to Lin'an (臨安; present-day Hangzhou, Zhejiang Province), the capital of the Southern Song dynasty, and offered as a sacrifice in the Song emperors' ancestral temple. Hong Zikui (洪咨夔) opposed his remains being sacrificed and instead proposed having Emperor Aizong's remains buried in a prison vault. The Song imperial court eventually heeded Hong Zikui's suggestion and buried Emperor Aizong.

Rashid-al-Din Hamadani's Jami' al-tawarikh provided a different account of the fate of Emperor Aizong's remains: It stated that the emperor's body was cremated by his personal bodyguards and the ashes were dumped into the river.
