= Emperor Xuanzong of Jin =

Emperor of Jin China from 1213 to 1224

Emperor Xuanzong of Jin 金宣宗

Emperor of the Jin dynasty
- Reign: 22 September 1213 – 14 January 1224
- Predecessor: Wanyan Yongji
- Successor: Emperor Aizong of Jin
- Born: 18 April 1160
- Died: 14 January 1224 (aged 63)
- Burial: De Mausoleum (德陵, in present-day Kaifeng, Henan)
- Spouse: Empress Rensheng: Empress Minghui; Lady Shi; Lady Pang
- Issue: Wanyan Shouzhong: Emperor Aizong; Wanyan Shouchun; Wanyan Xuanling; Princess of Wen
Names
- Sinicized name: Wanyan Xun (完顏珣), later Wanyan Congjia (完顏從嘉), later Wanyan Xun again: Jurchen name: Wudubu (吾睹補)
Era dates
- Zhenyou (貞祐): 1213–1217: Xingding (興定): 1217–1222; Yuanguang (元光): 1222–1223
Posthumous name
- Emperor Jitian Xingtong Shudao Qinren Yingwu Shengxiao (繼天興統述道勤仁英武聖孝皇帝)
Temple name
- Xuanzong (宣宗)
- House: Wanyan
- Dynasty: Jin
- Father: Wanyan Yungong
- Mother: Empress Zhaosheng

Emperor Xuanzong of Jin
- Chinese: 金宣宗
Transcriptions
Standard Mandarin
- Hanyu Pinyin: Jīn Xuānzōng

Wudubu
- Traditional Chinese: 吾睹補
- Simplified Chinese: 吾睹补
Transcriptions
Standard Mandarin
- Hanyu Pinyin: Wúdǔbǔ

Wanyan Xun
- Traditional Chinese: 完顏珣
- Simplified Chinese: 完颜珣
Transcriptions
Standard Mandarin
- Hanyu Pinyin: Wányán Xún

Wanyan Congjia
- Traditional Chinese: 完顏從嘉
- Simplified Chinese: 完颜从嘉
Transcriptions
Standard Mandarin
- Hanyu Pinyin: Wányán Cóngjiā

Emperor Xuanzong of Jin (18 April 1163 – 14 January 1224), personal name Wudubu, sinicized names Wanyan Xun and Wanyan Congjia, was the eighth emperor of the Jurchen-led Jin dynasty of China. He was the second Jin emperor to be defeated by the Mongol Empire, and the first after they crossed the Great Wall in 1211 during the Jin campaign.

== Life ==
Wudubu was a son of Wanyan Yungong (完顏允恭), a son of Emperor Shizong. He was a nephew of Wanyan Yongji, his predecessor as emperor. His mother was Lady Liu (劉氏), a concubine of Wanyan Yungong. In 1178, he was enfeoffed as the "Duke of Wen" (溫國公). In 1186, he chose for himself the sinicized name "Xun" (珣). In 1189, he was promoted to "Prince of Feng" (豐王). In 1196, his princely title was changed to "Prince of Yi" (翼王). In 1205, he changed his sinicized name to "Congjia" (從嘉). His princely titles were subsequently changed again, to "Prince of Xing" (邢王) and then "Prince of Sheng" (升王).

In the eighth month of 1213, the general Heshilie Zhizhong (紇石烈執中; also known as Hushahu 胡沙虎) rebelled against the emperor, Wanyan Yongji, and assassinated him. Hushahu then installed Wanyan Congjia on the throne to replace Wanyan Yongji. As Wanyan Congjia was stationed in Hebei at the time, Hushahu chose Wanyan Congjia's eldest son, Wanyan Shouzhong (完顏守忠), to temporarily serve as jianguo (監國; regent) in the capital, Zhongdu (中都; present-day Xicheng and Fengtai districts of Beijing). In the ninth month, Wanyan Congjia returned to Zhongdu and was crowned emperor; he is thus historically known as Emperor Xuanzong of the Jin dynasty. He appointed Hushahu as Grand Tutor (太師), Chief Imperial Secretary (尙書令), and Marshal of the Capital (都元帥), in addition to enfeoffing him as "Prince of Ze" (澤王). Shortly after his ascension, Emperor Xuanzong adopted the regnal name "Zhenyou" (貞祐). He also changed his sinicised name back from "Congjia" to "Xun". In the tenth month, Hushahu was assassinated by Zhuhu Gaoqi (朮虎高琪), another general, due to political infighting. Emperor Xuanzong pardoned Zhuhu Gaoqi and appointed him as Left Deputy Marshal (左副元帥).

In the Autumn of 1213, the Mongols, under the leadership of Genghis Khan, split their forces into three groups to attack the Jin dynasty. They conquered nearly all the prefectures and counties in Hebei; only 11 cities, including Zhongdu, Zhending Prefecture (眞定府; around present-day Zhengding County, Hebei Province), Daming Prefecture (大名府; around present-day Daming County, Hebei Province) did not fall to the Mongols.

In the third month of 1214, the Jin dynasty succeeded in negotiating for peace with the Mongols. However, on 27 June, Emperor Xuanzong left Zhongdu and moved the Jin capital southward to Bianjing (汴京; present-day Kaifeng, the old Song dynasty capital in Henan Province); the court reached Bianjing about two months later. The Mongols were angered, so they waged war against the Jin dynasty again. On 31 May 1215, Zhongdu fell to the Mongols. In the tenth month, the warlord Puxian Wannu rebelled against the Jin dynasty, and declared himself king of the Eastern Xia regime in Liaodong. In early 1220, Emperor Xuanzong had Zhuhu Gaoqi executed after Zhuhu Gaoqi's repeated failures to repel the Mongols, and also because Zhuhu Gaoqi eventually planned on rebelling.

Emperor Xuanzong's foreign policy towards the other states was a direct cause of the fall of the Jin dynasty. Firstly, he agreed to submit to Genghis Khan in return for peace between the Mongols and Jin dynasty. Secondly, he severed ties between the Jin dynasty and its ally, Western Xia. Thirdly, he ignored the advice of his chancellor, Tushan Yi (徒單鎰), and other ministers, and moved his capital from Zhongdu to Bianjing. Fourthly, he waged war against the Southern Song dynasty. These actions resulted in the Jin dynasty having to fight wars on three different fronts. Furthermore, they resulted in domestic instability and rebellions, which contributed even more to the decay of the Jin dynasty.

Emperor Xuanzong died in 1224. He was succeeded by his second son, Wanyan Shouxu (Emperor Aizong). He was posthumously honored with the temple name "Xuanzong," and was buried in the Deling Mausoleum (德陵) in present-day Kaifeng, Henan Province.

== Family ==
Consort and issue(s):

- Empress Rensheng, of the Wang clan (仁聖皇后王氏), sister of Empress Minghui
- Empress Minghui, of the Wang clan (明惠皇后王氏, d. 1231), sister of Empress Rensheng
  - Wanyan Shouxu, Emperor Aizong (金哀宗 完顏守緒, 25 September 1198 – 9 February 1234), 2nd son
- Consort Li, of the Shi clan (麗妃 史氏)
  - Wanyan Xuanling, Prince of Zhi (至王 完顏玄齡), 4th son
- Consort Zhen, of the Pang clan (真妃 龐氏)
  - Wanyan Shouchun, Prince of Jing (荊王完顏守純), 3rd son
- Unknown
  - Wanyan Shouzhong, Crown Prince Zhuangxian (莊獻太子 完顏守忠, d. 1215), 1st son
  - Princess of the Wen State (溫國公主), 1st daughter

== See also ==
- History of Beijing
