= Lady Wulinda =

Empress Mingde 明德皇后
- Died: 1152; Liangxiang
- Spouse: Emperor Shizong of Jin
- Issue: Hutuwa; Princess Yuguo
Posthumous name
- Empress Míngdé _{(after 1189)} 明德皇后; Empress Zhāodé _{(1163 – 1189)} 昭德皇后
- Clan: Wulinda (by birth); Wanyan (by marriage)
- Dynasty: Jin
- Father: Shituhei
- Mother: Lady Shenguo of the Wanyan clan

Lady Wulinda
- Chinese: 明德皇后烏林荅氏
Transcriptions
Standard Mandarin
- Hanyu Pinyin: Míngdé huánghòu wūlíndá shì

Empress Mingde of the Wulinda clan (died 1152, personal name unknown), also known by her first posthumous name Empress Zhaode, was the wife of Emperor Shizong of Jin, the fifth emperor of the Jurchen-led Chinese Jin dynasty. Although she committed suicide before her husband became emperor, he proclaimed her empress upon his ascension and never gave the title to any other of his consorts.

== Biography ==
The future Empress Mingde's father was the head of the Wulinda clan. After he led the clan to settle in the Jin capital Shangjing, it was arranged that his daughter would marry Wulu of the imperial family. Wulu was approximately 3 or 4 years old at the time. The young Lady Wulinda was reportedly clever, filial, and held in high-regard by members of her clan. After her marriage to Wulu, she also proved filial towards her in-laws. Husband and wife apparently had a good relationship, with Lady Wulinda managing the household and selecting new consorts for her husband, even after she gave birth to a son in 1146. The History of Jin reports that she fell ill once, so Wulu ordered medicine and did not leave her side for several days.

During Emperor Xizong's reign, she counselled her husband to appear submissive and loyal. Following her advice, Wulu managed to cultivate a good relationship with Xizong, even when the latter became increasingly violent and dependent on alcohol.

== Digunai's reign ==
When Digunai ascended the throne, he was similarly mistrustful of other male clan members, so Lady Wulinda advised her husband to send gifts frequently. When the family was in Jinan, Digunai - who was known for sexually assaulting women from his clan - summoned Lady Wulinda to Zhongdu.

Reasoning that Digunai would most likely kill Wulu if she committed suicide in Jinan, Lady Wulinda bade farewell to her husband, his servant, and her household, then left with Digunai's escort. On the journey to Zhongdu, the escort guarded her closely knowing that she did not want to meet Digunai, but 70 li from Zhongdu at Liangxiang, Lady Wulinda killed herself. Wulu travelled to Liangxiang and buried her in Wanping County.

== Legacy ==
After Digunai's death, Wulu ascended the throne as Emperor Shizong and conferred the posthumous title of Empress Zhaode on his deceased wife. He established a temple for her and rewarded her great-grandparents, grandparents, and parents. Later, he also promoted her brother to Grand Commandant and assigned her father the hereditary lands of Meng'an. In honour of her memory, Shizong refused to instate anyone else as empress. Affairs of the harem were thus overseen by Consort Yuan of the Li clan, who was only one rank below empress. In 1179, Empress Zhaode's body was moved to Kunhouling (坤厚陵). Consort Yuan of the Zhang clan, another of Shizong's consorts, was buried alongside her.

In the reign of Emperor Zhangzong, it was pointed out that Empress Zhaode's posthumous name contained the same characters as that of the dynasty's founder. Her name was thus changed to Empress Mingde.

== Family ==
- Father: Shituhei (石土黑)
- Mother: Lady Shenguo of the Wanyan clan (渖國夫人完顏氏)
- Brother: Moulianghu (謀良虎), sinicised name Wulinda Hui (烏林答暉)
- Husband: Emperor Shizong of Jin (29 March 1123 – 20 January 1189)
  - Son: Hutuwa (1146 – 1185)(胡土瓦), sinicised name Wanyan Yungong (完顏允恭), posthumously Emperor Xianzong of Jin (金顯宗)
  - Daughter: Princess Yuguo (豫國公主)
    - Son-in-law: Eliye (訛里也), sinicised name Wulugun Yuanzhong (烏古論元忠)
  - Son: Shunian 孰輦 (d. pre-1161), posthumous title Prince of Lu (魯王), then Prince of Zhao (趙王) when his nephew Emperor Zhangzong ascended the throne
  - Son: Xielu (d. pre-1161) (斜魯), posthumously Prince of Yue (越王)
