= Emperor Mo of Jin =

Emperor of Jin in 1234

Emperor Mo of Jin 金末帝

Emperor of the Jin dynasty
- Reign: 9 February 1234
- Predecessor: Emperor Aizong
- Born: 1202
- Died: 9 February 1234 (aged 31–32); Caizhou (in present-day Runan County, Henan, China)
Names
- Sinicised name: Wanyan Chenglin (完顏承麟); Jurchen name: Hudun (呼敦)
Era dates
- Shengchang (盛昌): 1234 (disputed)
- House: Wanyan
- Dynasty: Jin

Chinese name
- Chinese: 金末帝
Transcriptions
Standard Mandarin
- Hanyu Pinyin: Jīn Mòdì

Hudun
- Traditional Chinese: 呼敦
- Simplified Chinese: 呼敦
Transcriptions
Standard Mandarin
- Hanyu Pinyin: Hūdūn

Wanyan Chenglin
- Traditional Chinese: 完顏承麟
- Simplified Chinese: 完颜承麟
Transcriptions
Standard Mandarin
- Hanyu Pinyin: Wányán Chénglín

Emperor Mo of Jin (1202 – 9 February 1234), name Wanyan Chenglin, was the last emperor of the Jurchen-led Jin dynasty of China. Originally a military general, he inherited the throne from his predecessor, Emperor Aizong, during the siege of Caizhou. He was killed in action on the same day he was crowned emperor, when Caizhou fell to the allied forces of the Mongol Empire and Southern Song dynasty. Having ruled as emperor for a day, he holds the record for being the shortest-reigning monarch in Chinese history.

== Life ==
Wanyan Chenglin was a descendant of Helibo, the father of Aguda (Emperor Taizu), the founder and first emperor of the Jin dynasty. He served as a military general under the Jin dynasty. Emperor Aizong regarded him highly for his courage and talent. Wanyan Chenglin's elder brother, Wanyan Chengyi (完顏承裔), served as the chancellor, and was killed in action around 1232 in a battle at Pucheng (蒲城) against the Mongols.

In 1232, when the Mongol Empire attacked the Jin dynasty, Emperor Aizong abandoned the capital, Bianjing (汴京; present-day Kaifeng, Henan Province), and fled to Caizhou (蔡州; present-day Runan County, Henan Province). Wanyan Chenglin accompanied the emperor and stayed with him throughout the journey, while many ministers and officers deserted the emperor along the way. Upon arriving in Caizhou, Wanyan Chenglin advised Emperor Aizong to establish a central command and actively prepare defences for an attack by the Mongols.

In the first month of 1234, the Mongols allied with the Southern Song dynasty and besieged Caizhou. Emperor Aizong sensed that his doom was near, but did not want to be remembered in history as the last emperor of the Jin dynasty, so he announced his decision to abdicate and pass his throne to Wanyan Chenglin. Wanyan Chenglin refused to accept, but the emperor insisted and said, "I am fat and unable to ride on horseback into battle. If the city falls, it will be difficult for me to escape on horseback. You, on the other hand, are physically fit and strong. Moreover, you are a talented military leader. If you manage to escape, you can ensure that the dynasty lives on, and make a comeback in the future. This is my wish." Wanyan Chenglin reluctantly accepted.

On 9 February 1234, shortly after the abdication ceremony started, they received news that the enemy had breached the city walls. Emperor Aizong fled into the Youlan Room (幽蘭軒) and committed suicide by hanging himself. Wanyan Chenglin, on the other hand, rallied his soldiers and engaged the enemy in battle in the streets and alleys. He was eventually forced to retreat back into the inner city. When he received news of Emperor Aizong's death, he gathered his remaining followers, conducted a ceremony to mourn the emperor, and posthumously honoured him with the temple name "Aizong". He was killed in action on the same day when the enemy eventually overran and occupied the city. Historians refer to him as "Emperor Mo" (末帝; literally "last emperor") of the Jin dynasty.

Emperor Mo of Jin House of Wanyan (1115–1234) Born: 1202 Died: 1234
Regnal titles
Preceded by Emperor Aizong	Emperor of the Jin dynasty 1234	Succeeded by Dynasty dissolved
Preceded by Emperor Aizong	Emperor of China; 1234	Succeeded by Ögedei Khan as Khagan of Mongol Empire
