= Jin–Liao wars =

1113–1125 conflicts in East Asia

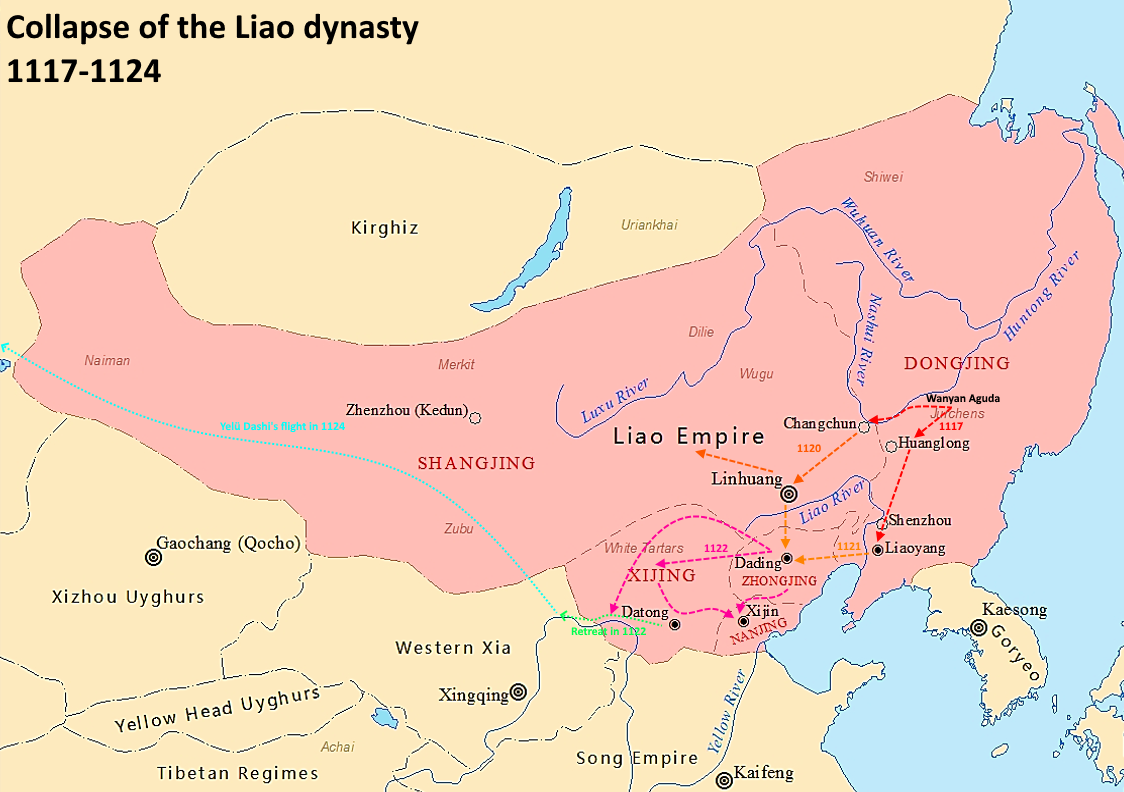
- Collapse of the Liao dynasty (1117–1124)
Date	1114 – March 26, 1125
Location	Northern China, Manchuria, a part of Inner Mongolia and Sixteen Prefectures
Result	Absolute victory of the Jin dynasty: The Liao dynasty completely collapsed
Territorial changes	Jin took control of the greater part of Liao territories

Belligerents
Jin dynasty	Liao dynasty

Commanders and leaders
Emperor Taizu of Jin; Emperor Taizong of Jin; Wanyan Zonghan; Wanyan Zongwang; Wanyan Lóushì	Emperor Tianzuo of Liao; Yelü Chun †; Yelü Dashi; Li Chuwen †; Xiao Sixian

The Jin–Liao Wars, also known as Jurchen Jin conquests of the Liao dynasty, were large-scale wars between the Khitan-led Liao dynasty (916–1125) and the Jurchen-led Jin dynasty (1115–1234). In the early 12th century, the Jurchen people led by the Wanyan chieftain Aguda rebelled against the Khitan-led Liao dynasty and conquered it in a series of military conflicts lasting from 1114 to 1125. The war came to a definitive end on March 26, 1125, when Emperor Tianzuo of Liao was captured by the Jurchens.

In the process of defeating the Liao, the Jurchens under Aguda formed their own Jin dynasty and became the dominant power in modern northern China, northeastern Korea, and the southern far east Russia.

== Background ==
The Jurchens were a Tungusic people who lived in fragmented tribes stretching northward from the border of Goryeo. They had been in contact with the Khitans ever since the beginning of the Liao dynasty. Despite their marginal status, they were militarily significant enough that the Song dynasty considered them a potential ally and periodically caused trouble for the Khitans. The Liao categorized the Jurchens into three groups: "civilized" Jurchens (shu nüzhi) descended from tribes captured early on by the Liao and assimilated into Khitan society, "obedient" Jurchens (shun nüzhi) subordinate to the Liao and had regular contact with the court, and "wild" Jurchens (sheng nüzhi) who inhabited the lower Songhua River valley and the eastern mountains of modern Heilongjiang. During the 11th century, one of the wild Jurchen clans called the Wanyan established dominance over their neighbors and created a semblance of Jurchen unity, which the Liao recognized by conferring the title of military governor upon their chieftains.

As the Wanyan clan consolidated their control over the Jurchens, relations with the Liao became increasingly strained. The Jurchens resented the behavior of Liao officials at Ningjiang, the main border trading post, who constantly cheated them. The Liao placed on them the obligation of supplying the Liao emperor with gyrfalcons called haidongqing, only bred on the coastal regions, which required the Jurchens to fight across the territory of their neighbors, the Five Nations, to access. Liao envoys also habitually beat their village elders and sexually abused their women.

In late 1112 when Emperor Tianzuo of Liao went on a fishing expedition to the Huntong River (modern Songhua River) where the Jurchen tribes were expected to pay homage to him. As a symbolic gesture of obeisance, the Jurchen chieftains were supposed to take turns dancing in the emperor's camp, but one of them, Aguda, refused. Tianzuo wanted him executed for his act of defiance but the influential chancellor, Xiao Fengxian, dissuaded him from that course and belittled the harm Aguda could do. Aguda was elected ruler of the Jurchens in the following year and immediately began harassing the Liao for the return of Ashu, a Jurchen chieftain who opposed Wanyan hegemony and had taken refuge in Liao territory. When his demands were refused, he began building fortifications on the Liao border.

== Jin–Liao combats ==
In the late autumn of 1114 Aguda attacked Ningjiang. Underestimating the Jurchen threat, Tianzuo only sent some Balhae detachments from the Eastern Capital, which were utterly defeated. Another force composed of Khitan and Kumo Xi troops led by Xiao Sixian, the brother of Xiao Fengxian, was also defeated on the Songhua. Despite Sixian's incompetence, he escaped punishment, leading to demoralization among Khitan generals. By the end of the year, several border prefectures had been taken by the Jurchens and some neighboring tribes had also joined them.

In 1115 Tianzuo sent envoys to negotiate with the Jurchens, but Aguda had already declared himself emperor of the Jin dynasty, and rejected the Liao letters because they did not address him by his new title. Aguda continued to demand the return of Ashu and the withdraw of Liao troops from Huanglong, the major administrative center of the region. Huanglong fell to the Jin in late autumn. Tianzuo assembled a massive army west of the Songhua and crossed the river in the winter of 1115. His invasion was undermined by a plot to dethrone him and install his uncle, Prince Chun. The conspirators led by Yelü Zhangnu deserted the army and sent messengers informing Chun of their plan. Chun refused to take part in the coup and beheaded Zhangnu's messengers. The rebels then went about the countryside creating havoc until they were defeated by a small group of Liao-affiliated Jurchens. Zhangnu was caught trying to escape to the Jin disguised as a messenger and was executed. More than 200 implicated nobles were executed and their families enslaved.

Meanwhile, in 1114, Balhae descendants took advantage of the war and rebelled under the leadership of Gu Yu, who commanded 30,000 soldiers. They defeated Khitan armies twice before they were destroyed. In 1116 another rebellion occurred at the Eastern Capital when a Balhae officer named Gao Yongchang declared himself emperor of the Yuan dynasty and requested aid from the Jin. The Jin relief troops sent to Yuan easily repulsed the Liao troops but then turned on the Balhae rebels and killed Gao Yongchang. With the destruction of the Yuan dynasty, the entire region east of the Liao River fell to the Jin. To ensure Chun's continued loyalty, he was made commander in chief of the Liao armies and entrusted with defense operations against the Jin. Chun proved to be an awful commander. His new army, composed of Balhae refugees, inflicted more damage on the civilian population than the enemies. When the Jin attacked Chunzhou on the Songhua in early 1117, the Liao army melted away, not even offering a token resistance. At the end of the year, the Jin forces crossed the Liao River, defeated Chun's army, and conquered several prefectures.

After the initial conquests by Jin, a lull in military activity followed. In 1118 Tianzuo initiated peace negotiations, but the Jin demands were so onerous, requesting half of the Liao empire in addition to payments of silk and silver, that they were impossible to meet. Aguda was unable to immediately continue attacking the Liao due to stretched resources. In 1119 a rebellion against the Jin occurred at the Eastern Capital and had to be suppressed. This brief interlude was no less kind to the Liao, which was plagued by famine, local rebellions, and defections to the Jin. Hostilities renewed in the spring of 1020 when Aguda broke off negotiations.

The Jin captured the Supreme Capital in mid-1120 and stopped its advance to escape the summer heat. In the spring of 1121, Tianzuo's second wife, Lady Wen, conspired with her brother in law, General Yelü Yudu, to depose the emperor and enthrone her son. The plot was uncovered by Xiao Fengxian, whose sister, Lady Yuan, also hoped to have her son succeed. Lady Wen was forced to commit suicide but Yudu escaped and defected to the Jin. He was allowed to remain in command of his troops and in the winter of 1121–22, he led Jin forces to capture the Central Capital. Leaving Prince Chun in charge of the Southern Capital, Tianzuo fled through Juyong Pass to the Western Capital. Shortly afterward, Tianzuo grew tired of Xiao Fengxian's manipulations, which had caused the death of his son, and forced him to commit suicide. Tianzuo then fled to the Yin Mountains where he tried to recruit fresh troops from local tribes. Following his trail, the Jin took the Western Capital in the spring of 1122. The Tanguts, fearing an invasion of their border, sent troops in support of Tianzuo and blocked the Jurchen advance. Soon after Aguda arrived, he defeated a Khitan-Tangut force near the Western Xia border, and turned back east to take the Southern Capital where Prince Chun had been declared the new Liao emperor (Northern Liao).

Three months after becoming emperor, Chun died, leaving his widowed empress in charge. In the late autumn of 1122, her commanders Guo Yaoshi and Gao Feng defected with their troops to the Song. They led Song troops in an attack on the Southern Capital, but even in the Liao's withered state, the Song army was still unable to overcome Khitan defenses and failed to take the city. In the winter, Aguda took the Southern Capital, and the remaining Khitans fled in two groups to the west. One group led by Xiao Gan fled to Western Xia where they set up a short lived Xi dynasty that lasted five months before Gan died at the hands of his own troops. The other group, led by Yelü Dashi, joined Tianzuo at the Xia border. In the early summer of 1123, Dashi was captured by the Jin and forced to lead them to Tianzuo's camp, where the entire imperial family except for Tianzuo and one son were captured. Tianzuo sought refuge with Emperor Chongzong of Western Xia, who while initially receptive, changed his mind after warnings from the Jurchens and declared himself a vassal of Jin in 1124. Tianzuo fled further north into the steppes where he traded his clothes for food from the Khongirad. In spite of all these setbacks, Tianzuo still held onto the delusion of retaking the Western and Southern Capitals, and attacked nearby prefectures. Dashi, who had rejoined Tianzuo, grew tired of his behavior and left for the west. Tianzuo was captured in early 1125 and taken to the Jin court where he held the title of "king of the seashore" (haipin wang). According to the History of Liao, Tianzuo died at the age of 54 in 1128.

== Aftermath ==
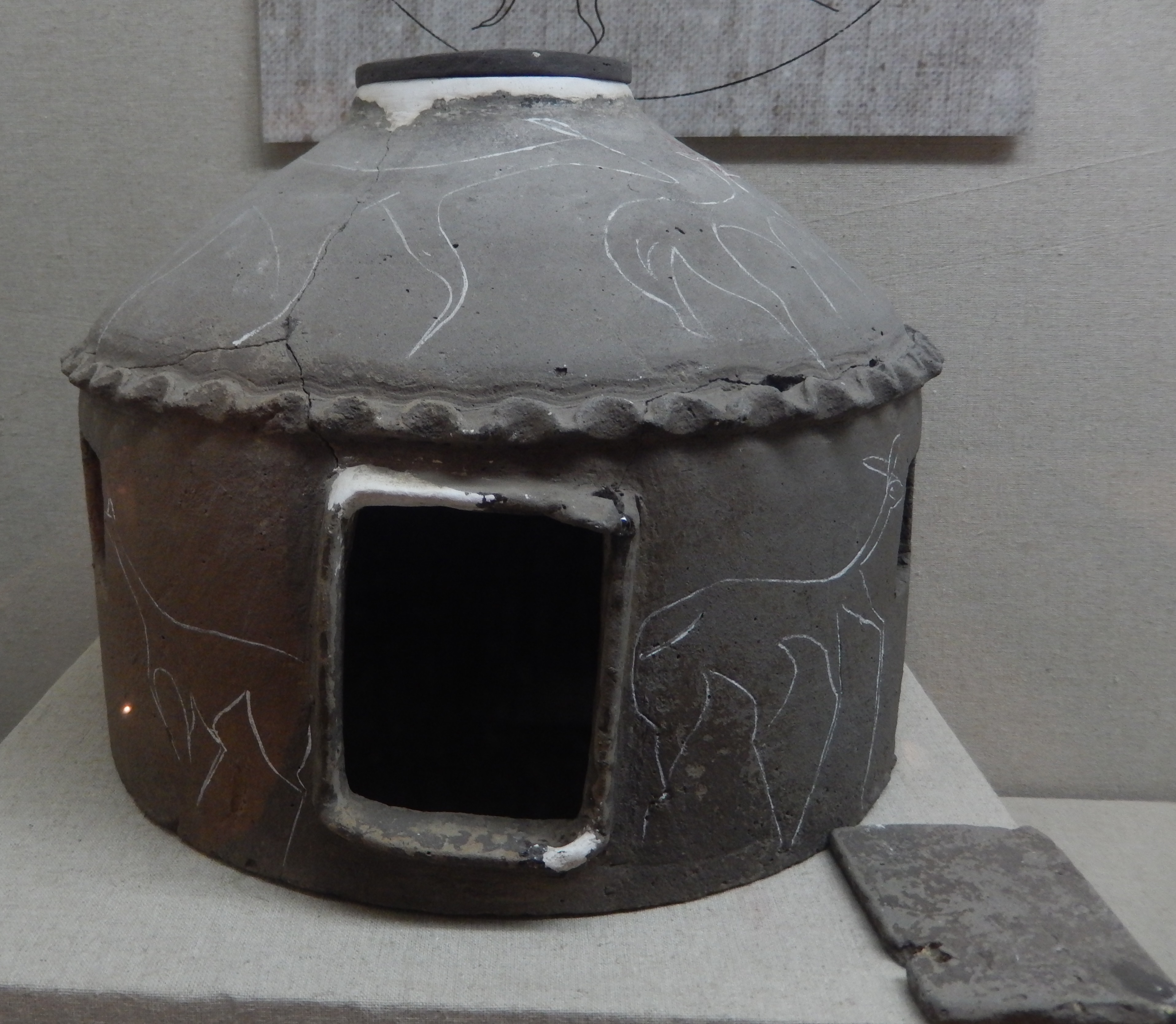
Miniature model of a Khitan tent found in the Hadatu tomb in 1973

Remnants of the Liao Khitans led by Yelü Dashi fled westward and eventually came to be known as the Qara Khitai, although they officially claimed to be the Liao dynasty. After the defeat of the Liao, Yelü Dashi fled northwest and established his headquarter at the military garrison of Kedun (Zhenzhou) on the Orkhon River. Dashi secured the allegiance of the garrison forces numbering 20,000 and declared himself gurkhan (universal khan). In 1130, Dashi led his host further west in search of new territory. Within a year, he had established himself as suzerain of Qocho and gained a foothold in Transoxiana. After conquering the Karakhanid city of Balasaghun (in modern Kyrgyzstan), he attempted to reclaim former Liao territory, which ended in disaster. Failing in that endeavor, Dashi established a permanent Khitan state in Central Asia, known as the Qara Khitai or the Western Liao dynasty in historiography. The new Liao empire expanded to the Aral Sea, defeating the Kara-Khanid Khanate and Seljuk Empire at the Battle of Qatwan in 1141, and establishing their dominance in the region.

Simultaneously during the invasion of Central Asia, Dashi also sent invasion forces to attack the Jin and retake Liao territory, however these efforts proved fruitless and ended in defeat. Yelü Dashi had originally hoped to recapture northern China from the Jin dynasty and restore the territories once held by the Liao dynasty. However, he soon discovered the relative weakness of his empire vis-a-vis the Jin dynasty and gave up the idea after a disastrous attack on the Jin dynasty in 1134. The Western Liao continued to defy Jin supremacy in 1146, and continued sending scouts and small military units against the Jin in 1156, 1177, 1185, 1188. This indicates that for the first 2 generations there remained considerable interest in reconquest.

Yelü Dashi's dynasty was usurped by the Naimans under Kuchlug in 1211 and traditional Chinese, Persian, and Arab sources consider the usurpation to be the end of the dynasty. The empire ended with the Mongol conquest in 1218.

The Jin continued their military conquests with the Jin–Song wars and in 1127, took the Song capital of Kaifeng in what came to be known as the Jingkang incident. After conquering much of northern China, the Jin became the most powerful and expansive dynasty in East Asia. But from the year of 1211, they lost most of their territory to the Mongol Empire in Mongol–Jin wars, and was finally conquered by them in 1234.

== Bibliography ==
- Biran, Michal (2005). The Empire of the Qara Khitai in Eurasian History: Between China and the Islamic World. Cambridge Studies in Islamic Civilization. Cambridge, England: Cambridge University Press. ISBN 0521842263.
- Kim, Alexander (2011), The Historiography of Bohai in Russia
- Morgan, David; Stewart, Sarah, eds. (2017). The Coming of the Mongols. Bloomsbury Publishing. ISBN 9781786733832.
- Twitchett, Denis (1994), "The Liao", The Cambridge History of China, Volume 6, Alien Regime and Border States, 907–1368, Cambridge: Cambridge University Press, pp. 43–153, ISBN 0521243319
