= Zhao Yupan =

Zhao Yupan 趙玉盤
- Born: 1100
- Died: 1141 (aged 40–41)
- Spouse: Zeng Yin; Wanyan Zongpan; Emperor Xizong of Jin
- Issue: Lady Zeng; Lady Zeng; Prince Wanyan
Posthumous name
- Princess Jiade (嘉德帝姬)
- Clan: House of Zhao
- Father: Emperor Huizong of Song
- Mother: Empress Zheng

Zhao Yupan (Chinese: 趙玉盤, Pinyin: Zhào Yùpán; 1100–1141), formally known by her title as Princess Jiade (Chinese: 嘉德帝姬), was the eldest daughter of Song dynasty Emperor Huizong born by Able Consort Zheng, later his empress.

== Life ==
Princess Jiade was born by Consort Zheng, in the year her father became Emperor. Her mother was one of her father's highly ranked consorts, initially holding the rank of Able Consort (賢妃), later promoted to Empress Consort (皇后). By the same mother, she had five younger siblings: four sisters and one brother.

On 29 May 1101, Zhao Yupan was titled Princess Deqing (德庆公主). In 1109, her title was changed to Princess Jaifu (嘉福公主).

In the Year 1115, on May 5, Zhao Yupan married General Zeng Yi with whom she had two daughters. One of her daughters was not captured by Jin dynasty's army and was able to be married to Xu Gongxuan. The second daughter was captured along with Zhao Yupan and Zeng Yi after the Jingkang Incident and was later married to Wanyan Tata.

In 1127, she married Wanyan Zongpan, eldest son of Jin Emperor, with who had an unnamed son. Again in 1139, she married Emprror Xizong.

== Family ==
Consort and their Respective Issue(s):

- Husband: Zeng Yin (曾夤; b. 1100), descendent of Zeng Gongliang
  - Lady Zeng (曾氏), 1st daughter
    - Married Xu Gongxuan (徐公选)
  - Lady Zeng (曾氏), 2nd daughter
    - Married Wanyan Tata (完顏挞挞; d.1140), third son of Wanyan Xiyin
- Husband: Wanyan Zongpan, Prince of Song (宋王 完顏宗磐; d. 1139), the 1st son of Wanyan Sheng
  - Prince Wanyan (完顏), 1st son
- Husband: Wanyan Dan, Emperor Xizong (金熙宗 完顏亶; 28 February 1119 – 9 January 1150)
