= The Accounts of Jingkang =

Series of historical accounts from China's Southern Song dynasty

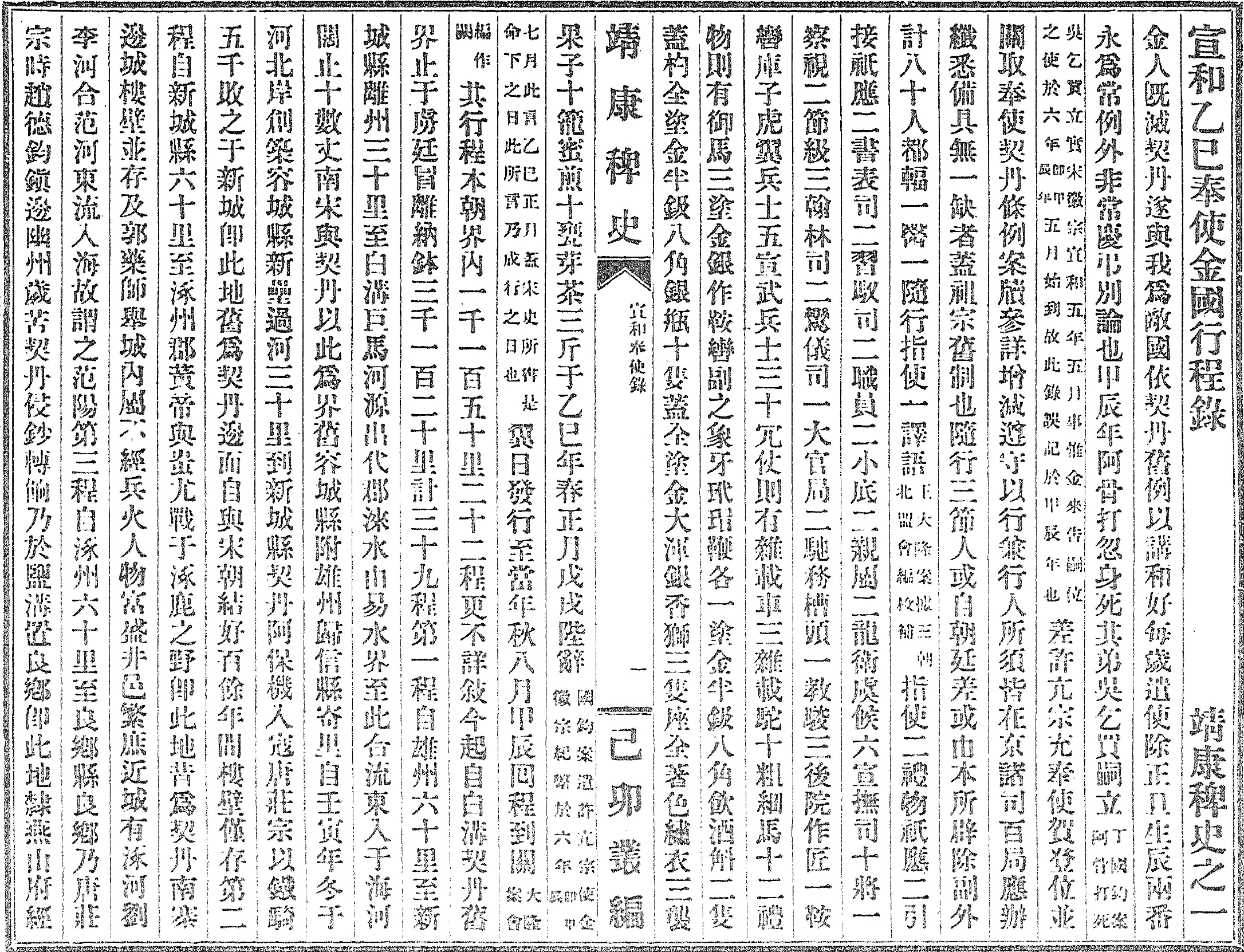
- The first page of the 1939 printed edition
- Editors: Que An (確庵); Nai An (耐庵)
- Original title: 靖康稗史
- Language: Classical Chinese

The Accounts of Jingkang (Chinese: 靖康稗史) is a series of Chinese books about the events of the Jingkang incident, which took place in 1127 in the Song dynasty, credited to be one of the most detailed accounts about the Jurchen-led Jin dynasty in the Jin–Song Wars and its aftermath.

== Contents ==
There are 7 books in the series:

- Tour of Duty to Jin in 1119 – 1125 AD (宣和乙巳奉使金國行程錄)
- Tales of a man in bottle (甕中人語)
- Accounts in Kaifeng (開封府狀)
- Expedition to the South (南征錄彙)
- Tales of the Green Palace (青宮譯語)
- Moaning (呻吟語)
- Records of the Song Captives (宋俘記)

Among them, Tour of Duty could be found in other contemporary sources, which was about the records of Emperor Huizong of Song's envoy for the ascension of Emperor Taizong of Jin in 1125. The other six books, however, can only be found in The Accounts of Jingkang, and all of them are about the Jin–Song Wars and the abduction of the House of Zhao after the war.

As recorded in the first preface of The Accounts of Jingkang, Que An (確庵) first compiled the book in 1164, by the time titled A Record of Shared Ire (同憤錄), and it was kept by Gu family of Lin'an Prefecture, but the former half of it was lost. As of 1267, Nai An (耐庵) discovered the book, believing that the lost content was about events before the Jingkang incident, so he added two Song books as alternatives accordingly. The other preface of the book, might have been written by King Taejong of Joseon dated 1407, claimed that the book was once King Chungnyeol of Goryeo's collection; the epilogue further argued that the book spread in Joseon and Japan, before being known in China, by the time of the Qing dynasty in the late 19th century.

== History ==
In 1892, Xie Jiafu (謝家福) gave a manuscript of The Accounts of Jingkang to Ding Bing (丁丙), who believed that the said editor "Nai An" might have been Shi Nai'an (author of the early Chinese novel Water Margin), and it later became the collection of the Nanjing Library and collated by Ding Bingheng (丁秉衡) as of 1910. The most common modern edition of the book was published in 1939, yet it lacks proofreading and was later revised by the Zhonghua Book Company in 1988. As it is believed that the content of The Accounts of Jingkang were first-person narrative by people of both Song and Jin dynasty, researchers generally consider the book veritable after its discovery.

=== Doubts of forgery ===
However, The Accounts of Jingkang is not listed in the Joseon Dynasty Series titles, which contains the available books from Joseon. Pointing to several inconsistencies, including location differences before and after the Yellow River flood in 1128, some researchers from China and Japan argued that The Accounts of Jingkang might be a false document.
