= Wanyan Xiyin =

Jurchen noble and civil minister

Personal details
- Born: Gushen (穀神); Wushi (兀室/悟室); Hushe (胡舍); Unknown
- Died: 1140

Military service
- Allegiance: Jin dynasty (1115–1234)

Wanyan Xiyin
- Traditional Chinese: 完顏希尹
- Simplified Chinese: 完颜希尹
Transcriptions
Standard Mandarin
- Hanyu Pinyin: Wányán Xīyǐn

Gushen (Jurchen name)
- Traditional Chinese: 穀神
- Simplified Chinese: 谷神
Transcriptions
Standard Mandarin
- Hanyu Pinyin: Gǔshén

Wushi (Jurchen name)
- Chinese: 兀室/悟室
Transcriptions
Standard Mandarin
- Hanyu Pinyin: Wùshì

Hushe (Jurchen name)
- Chinese: 胡舍
Transcriptions
Standard Mandarin
- Hanyu Pinyin: Húshé

Gushen (died 1140), also known as Wushi or Hushe, and better known by his sinicised name Wanyan Xiyin, was a Jurchen noble and civil minister who lived in the founding and early years of the Jurchen-led Jin dynasty (1115–1234), which ruled northern China between the 12th and 13th centuries. He was a chief adviser to Aguda (Emperor Taizu), the founder and first emperor of the Jin dynasty. Described by modern writers as the "Chief Shaman" of the pre-Jin Jurchen state, he became deeply interested in Han Chinese culture, and is particularly known as the creator of the first writing system for the Jurchen language.

== Family ==
- Consort Zheng (正妃 元妃烏古論氏), of the Wugulun clan
- Consort Li (李次妃 李氏; d. 1110 ), of the Li clan, personal name Shunying (舜英)
- Concubine Wang (王妾 王氏), of the Wang clan, personal name Mao'er (猫儿)
- Concubine Liu (刘妾刘氏), of the Liu clan, personal name Baigu (百古)
- Concubine Zhang (章妾章氏), of the Zhang clan, personal name Haolang (好郎)
- Concubine Sun (孙妾孙氏), of the Sun clan, personal name Xingnu (星奴)
- Concubine Zhao (趙妾趙氏), of the Zhao clan, personal name Fujin (福金), daughter of Emperor Huizong

Issues:

- Wanyan Bada (完顏把荅; d.1140), first son
- Wanyan Mandai (完顏漫帶; d.1140), second son
- Wanyan Tata (完顏挞挞; d.1140), third son

== Life ==
Wanyan Xiyin's original Jurchen name is transcribed in Chinese sources as "Gushen", "Wushi" or "Hushe". He was from the Wanyan tribe, the ruling clan of the Jin dynasty, but was not in the direct imperial family line. His father was Huandu (歡都), a cousin of Aguda (Emperor Taizu), the founder of the Jin dynasty. Along with Nianhan (Wanyan Zonghan), Wanyan Xiyin was one of the chief advisers to Aguda. He helped Aguda in unifying the various Jurchen tribes under the Wanyan tribe's leadership, and overthrowing the Khitan-led Liao dynasty. After Aguda's death, Wanyan Xiyin continued to serve as a civil minister in the imperial court of Wuqimai (Emperor Taizong), Aguda's younger brother and successor. However, he fell into disgrace during the reign of Emperor Xizong, Emperor Taizong's successor, and was eventually forced to commit suicide in 1140.

According to contemporary Chinese sources, Wanyan Xiyin "was crafted and talented. It was he who personally devised laws and the script for the Jurchen, and thus shaped them into one state (guo; 國). The people of the state called him shan-man (珊蠻); shan-man in Jurchen refers to a shaman. This is because he understood changing conditions like a god. From Nianhan down, nobody was able to be his equal."

As the translator of this text, Herbert Franke, notes, this may be the earliest known Chinese document in which the term shaman (珊蠻) is attested; it corresponds to the Manchu saman ("shaman, sorcerer").

Wanyan Xiyin was fascinated by Chinese classics, and collected a large library when Jurchens seized and looted the capital of the Northern Song dynasty, Bianjing (present-day Kaifeng), in the Jin–Song Wars. He invited several Han Chinese scholars, led by Yuwen Xuzhong (宇文虛中; a Song envoy detained by the Jurchens), to advise him and to teach his sons and grandsons. Hong Hao (洪皓) – another Song envoy similarly detained by the Jurchens – though that it was under Yuwen Xuzhong's influence that a variety of Han Chinese cultural practices entered the Jin dynasty, such as the forms of government organisations, the scale of official ranks, salaries, and hereditary privileges, as well as the rules for assigning posthumous names to emperors and the taboo against using characters that appear in emperors' names.

The instruction offered by Yuwen Xuzhong and other Han Chinese scholars must have been successful, as Wanyan Xiyin's sons were able to write Chinese poems for Hong Hao. The degree of their sinicisation was high enough for one of them to become one of the first Jurchens to have a Han Chinese wife.

The tombs of Wanyan Xiyin and his family members are said to be located near present-day Shulan, Jilin Province. Since 1961, they have been listed on the provincial register of the protected historical sites.

== Jurchen script ==
On Aguda's orders, in 1119 or 1120, Wanyan Xiyin created the Jurchen script, known as the "large-character script", for use in the administration of the new Jurchen (Jin) Empire. He based it on Chinese characters and the Khitan script.

== See also ==
- Shamanism in the Qing dynasty
