= Bandit Kings of Ancient China =

1989 video game

- Box art
- Developer: Koei
- Platforms: MSX, NES, MS-DOS, Amiga, Macintosh, Saturn, PlayStation
- Release: 1989: MS-DOS, Amiga; December 1990: NES; 1996: PlayStation, Saturn
- Genre: Turn-based strategy
- Modes: Single-player, multiplayer

Bandit Kings of Ancient China, also known as Suikoden: Tenmei no Chikai (水滸伝・天命の誓い; lit. Water Margin: Oath of Destiny) in Japan, is a turn-based strategy video game developed and published by Koei, and released in 1989 for MSX, MS-DOS, Amiga, and Macintosh and in 1990 for the Nintendo Entertainment System. In 1996, Koei issued a remake for the Japanese Sega Saturn and PlayStation featuring vastly improved graphics and new arrangements of the original songs.

== Gameplay ==
Based on the 14th century Great Classical Novel Water Margin, the game takes place in ancient China during the reign of Emperor Huizong of the Song Dynasty. The Bandit Kings of Ancient China—a band of ten bandits—engage in war against China's Minister of War Gao Qiu, an evil minister with unlimited power. The objective of the game is to build, sustain, and command an army of troops to capture Gao Qiu before the Jurchen invasion in January 1127. Players hold certain attributes such as strength, dexterity, and wisdom. Players must also deal with other situations such as taxes, care for the troops, maintenance and replacement of weapons and equipment, forces of nature, and troop unrest and desertion.

Battlefields take place on hexagonal grids, where players move their armies across various terrain in order to strategically engage and defeat the enemy army. Troops have the capability of fighting with either melee weapons, bows and arrows, magic, or dueling swords, as well as setting tiles on fire. When a player defeats an enemy army, they have the option of recruiting, imprisoning, exiling, or executing the captured enemy troops. The attacker has 30 days to defeat all deployed enemy troops, capture the commander, or be automatically defeated. The game ends in defeat for the player(s) when the game calendar hit January 1127.

The game map shows the empire composed of 49 prefectures. Any prefecture may be invaded from an adjacent territory - the only exception is the current location of Gao Qiu (usually the capital, Kai Feng) where the player must have built up sufficient popularity to gain the attention of the emperor who will confer an Imperial Edict permitting the player to march into the capital.

== Reception ==
In the February-March 1990 edition of Games International (Issue 13), Paul Mason admired the manual, calling it "extensive and clearly presented," and the graphics, which he called "effective." However, after playing the game for a month, Mason still had not come close to earning the Royal Edict in order to fight Gao Qiu. He pointed out that in a multi-player game, only one player will earn the Royal Edict, and "it's going to be clear halfway into the game who's got a chance of winning and who hasn't. There isn't that much fun to be had by those who haven't." He concluded by giving the game an average rating of 7 out of 10 for gameplay and 8 out of 10 for graphics, saying, "As a multi-player game it has problems [...] As a solo game it works fine apart from the excessive difficulty."

A reviewer in the Austin American-Statesman suggested the game's depth was overwhelming, calling the game "the richest, most complex role-playing game ever published" but saying he "had trouble figuring out ... what [he] was supposed to be doing and to whom."

Johnny L. Wilson reviewed the game for Computer Gaming World, and stated that "Bandit Kings of Ancient China offers the proverbial "something for everyone" except the dyed-in-the-wool arcade gamer. There are only a handful of games that this reviewer has ever played that have caused him to play into the wee small hours of the morning without realizing it. Bandit Kings of Ancient China is one of them."

PC Magazine reviewed the game positively, concluding that it "is an addictive game, brought alive by a mixture of computer-driven personalities, the romance of a departed culture, a large battery of options, and the unpredictability of game play."

Computer Gaming World gave the game three out of five stars in 1990, and two stars in 1993.

Reviewing the NES version of Bandit Kings of Ancient China, Nintendo Power suggested some players might find the game's pace slow compared to action-oriented games, while others would enjoy the game's "depth, involvement, and attention to detail."

Compute! magazine praised the game as "one of the most complete and entertaining role-playing simulations available", and gave it an honorable mention in the War/Strategy category of the 1991 Compute Choice Awards.

The Amiga version received positive reviews in Amiga magazines.

The game was reviewed in 1994 in Dragon #211 by Jay & Dee in the "Eye of the Monitor" column. Both reviewers gave the game 3½ out of 5 stars.

In 1996, Computer Gaming World named Bandit Kings of Ancient China antagonist Gao Qiu the 12th most memorable game villain.
