= Court Ladies Preparing Newly Woven Silk =

Painting attributed to Emperor Huizong

- 搗練圖卷 (Chinese)
- Artists: attributed to Emperor Huizong; original by Zhang Xuan
- Year: early 12th century
- Type: Ink, color and gold on silk
- Dimensions: 37.7 cm × 466 cm (14.8 in × 183 in)
- Location: Museum of Fine Arts, Boston, United States

Court Ladies Preparing Newly Woven Silk is a silk painting attributed to Emperor Huizong of the Song dynasty. It is the only surviving copy of a lost original Court Ladies Preparing Newly Woven Silk by the Chinese artist Zhang Xuan. The painting depicts an annual imperial ceremony of silk production, held in spring. It shows three groups of Tang dynasty court ladies at work. Viewing from left, one figure sitting on the ground is preparing a thread and the other is sewing while sitting on a stool. The right group of four ladies is pounding the silk with wooden poles. The group stretching and ironing the silk and the right group which is pounding the silk with wooden poles are depicted in a diamond-shaped formation to produce the feeling of a three-dimensional space.

Originally kept in the Palace Museum in Beijing, the painting was acquired by the Boston Museum of Fine Arts in August 1912.

== See also ==
- Silk industry in China
