= Hong Hao =

Chinese financial analyst

- 洪灏
- Born: Guangzhou, Guangdong, China
- Education: University of International Business and Economics (BA); Australian Graduate School of Management (MBA)
- Occupation: Financial analyst

Hong Hao (Chinese: 洪灏; pinyin: Hóng Hào) is a Chinese financial analyst covering macro strategy who currently is Managing Partner of Lotus Asset Management. He was previously the Head of Research for Bank of Communications (BOCOM) International.

Hong is known for accurately predicting the 2010 flash crash, the Chinese Banking Liquidity Crisis of 2013 and the 2015–2016 Chinese stock market turbulence. Bloomberg L.P. has named Hao as "China's most accurate strategist" and the Asiamoney survey put him as the No. 1 China Strategist and No. 1 economist in 2017.

== Early life and education ==
Hong was born and raised in Guangzhou, Guangdong province.

Hong attended Zhixin High School graduating in 1992. Originally his grades were below average but improved as he got older. In the Gaokao, Hong ranked second in the whole of Guangdong province for the liberal arts stream.

Hong attended University of International Business and Economics. After graduation he briefly worked as an official at the Ministry of Commerce before moving to Australia to attend Australian Graduate School of Management for his master's degree.

Since 2001, Hong has been a Chartered Financial Analyst charter holder.

== Career ==
After getting his master's degree, Hong's first job in finance was at the Macquarie Group where he was employed as an equity research analyst. Later Hong moved to New York where he was employed by Morgan Stanley and then Citigroup.

In 2009, Hong moved back to China to work at China International Capital Corporation (CICC) in Beijing. According to Hong, he met Zhu Yunlai through mutual acquittances. Hong had researched the 2008 Chinese milk scandal which at the time had little analysis. Zhu was impressed with the research and recruited Hong to work for CICC. As the recruitment process was very strict, it took until the end of 2009, before Hong could be employed. During his time there, he developed its first quantitative stock market model.

In 2012 Hong moved to Hong Kong to work as Head of Research for BOCOM International. There were multiple factors for his move such as his parents lived in Guangzhou which was closed to Hong Kong. He also preferred it to Beijing as it was closer to the sea, had no smog issues and lower income taxes. However the biggest factor was Hong Kong allowed much more freedom of analysts where they could make more bold predictions which is something he would find difficult to do at CICC.

In 2022, Hong resigned from his position at BOCOM International for personal reasons. He then joined GROW Investment Group, a Shanghai-based hedge fund that is backed by Navigator Global Investments and Julius Baer Group.

In April 2025, Hong left his role to become CEO of the international unit of Huafu Securities, an affiliate of Industrial Bank. However in June, he resigned from his role to start his own company, Lotus Asset Management.

== Analysis and predictions ==
At the end of 2011, Hong predicted that the market would undergo a major adjustment in the first half of 2012. Later the SSE Composite Index fell from 2,500 to 1,900. Bloomberg stated he was the only person to hold a bearish position at the time.

Hong also predicted the Chinese Banking Liquidity Crisis of 2013.

In June 2015 during the 2015–2016 Chinese stock market turbulence, Hong stated the next six months would be a critical period for the bubble to burst which at the time was against the mainstream view of the market.

In 2022, Hong's reports covered sensitive issues in china such as U.S. delistings of Chinese companies, the China tech crackdown, the risk of capital flight from China and the economic impact of the COVID-19 lockdown in China. He outlined a worst-case scenario where the SSE Composite Index would drop below 3,000. The social media accounts that Hong uses to post his research and analysis such as WeChat and Weibo were suspended. It was speculated this played a role in Hong's resignation from BOCOM International

At the end of October 2022, Hong stated that Hong Kong and China shares had bottomed out and that once the COVID-19 restrictions were lifted in a few months, the stock market would rally with the Hang Seng Index reaching as high as 23,000 in the next 12 months. By May 2023, the index had gone up 54%. At that time he also stated he could see Chinese stocks continuing to resume their upward momentum even if the U.S. undergoes a recession. However he also stated that China's economy was now more closely correlated with US monetary policy than before the pandemic and that China's consumption is not big enough to drive economic recovery. Chinese households overextended during the pandemic and were not in a position to borrow more to spend.

In September 2023, Hong stated that it could take years if not a decade to fix the Chinese property sector crisis. In addition urbanization in China was coming to a halt. He then stated once people reset their expectation and the economy restructures to regrow from other industries rather than relying on real estate, the better it is for the Chinese economy.

In September 2024, Hong stated that Donald Trump's threat to smack 100% tariffs on countries that "leave" the U.S. dollar would be a "lose-lose" situation for the U.S. and China.

Hong's research reports are always published in English and do not have any templates. Hong prefers to start from scratch and rely on analysis and models rather than just reciting official information from reports. His reports are often cited by the media. Hong has stated he is afraid of the media asking for his target price as the market is very volatile so it is impractical.

Hong has described his job as "putting his neck on the line". He stated while everyone is eventually wrong, making a prediction that goes against the consensus is dangerous because it means the others are wrong and analysts tend to be risk-averse.

== Personal life ==
Hong is fluent in Mandarin, Cantonese and English. This allows him to do interviews with a variety of media channels which include CCTV, Phoenix Television, TVB Jade, Bloomberg News, CNBC and China Global Television Network.

Hong's hobby includes reading where he enjoys the works of Astrid Lindgren and James Herriot.

In October 2020, Hong published a book named Forecasting Economy. Cycles and Market Bubbles.
