= Zhang Xuan =

Chinese painter (713–755)

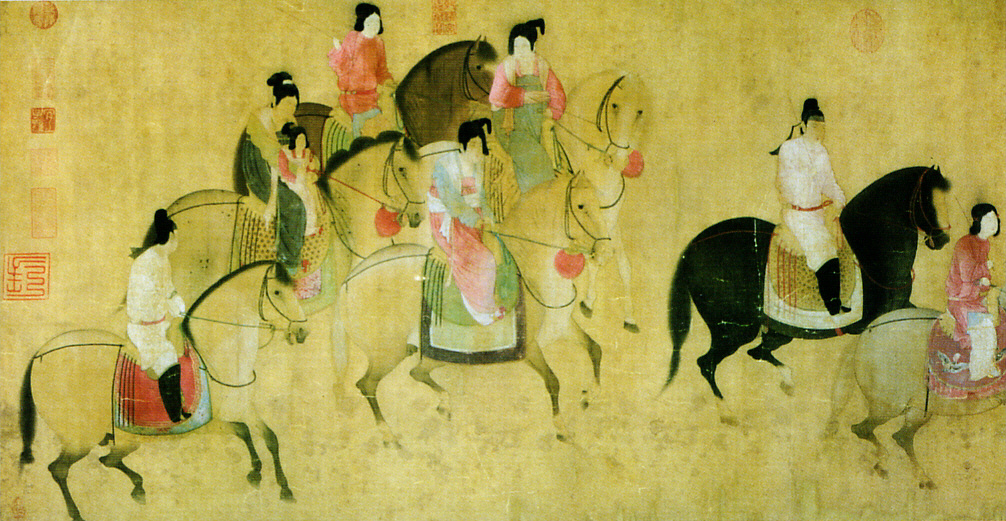
Spring Outing of the Tang Court, by Zhang Xuan.

Zhang Xuan (traditional Chinese: 張萱; simplified Chinese: 张萱; pinyin: Zhāng Xuān; Wade–Giles: Chang Hsüan) (713–755) was a Chinese painter who lived during the Tang dynasty (618–907).

Zhang Xuan painted many pieces of art, one of his best-known paintings is Court Ladies Preparing Newly Woven Silk, of which a single copy survives painted by Emperor Huizong of Song (r. 1100–1125) in the early 12th century. He also painted the Spring Outing of the Tang Court, which was later remade by Li Gonglin.

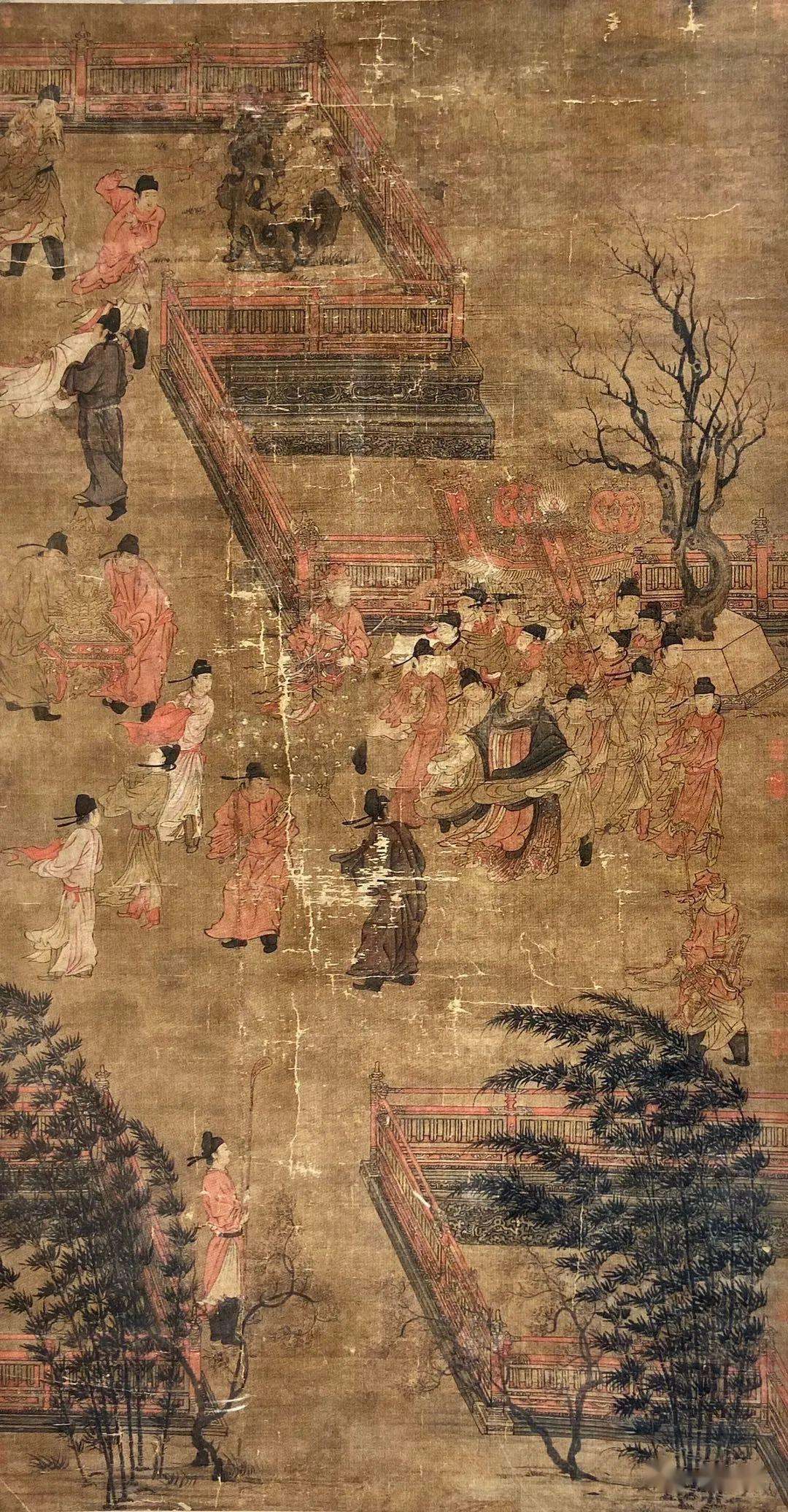
Tang Empress travels with attendants, depicting Wu Zetian and attendants.

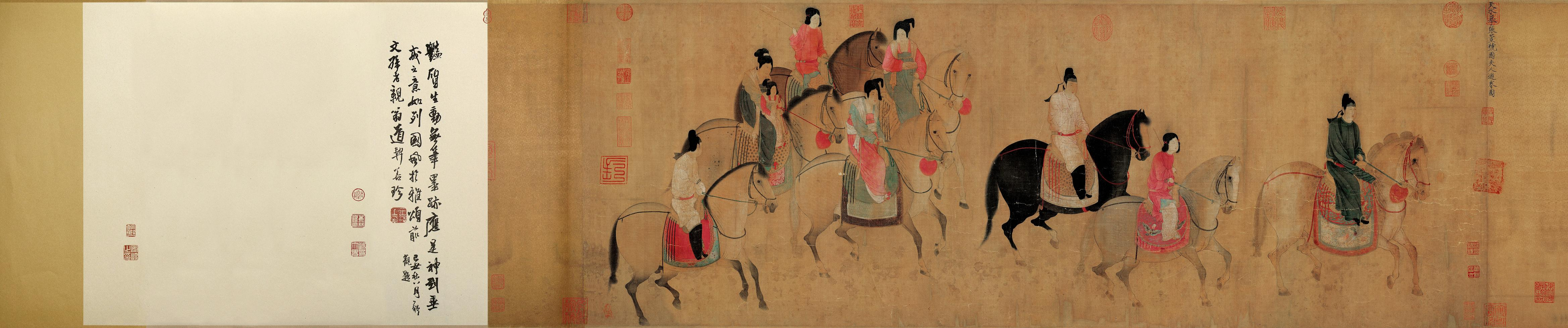
Spring Outing of the Tang Court, full painting
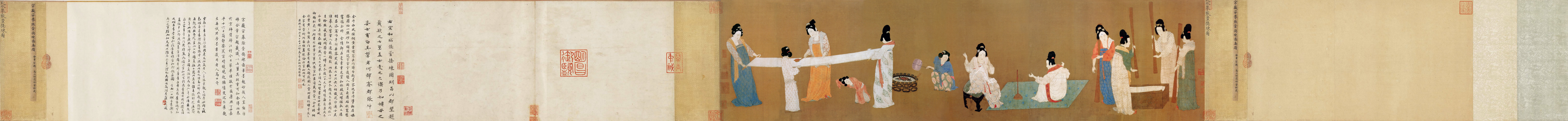
Court Ladies Preparing Newly Woven Silk, Emperor Huizong of Song's reproduction

== See also ==
- Tang dynasty painting
