= Wanyan Zonghan =

Jin dynasty general

- Birth name: Nianhan (粘罕); Nianmohe (粘沒喝); Wujianu (鳥家奴) (childhood name)
- Born: 1080
- Died: 1136 (aged 55–56)
- Allegiance: Jin dynasty
- Battles / wars: Jin–Song Wars

Wanyan Zonghan
- Traditional Chinese: 完顏宗翰
- Simplified Chinese: 完颜宗翰
Transcriptions
Standard Mandarin
- Hanyu Pinyin: Wányán Zōnghàn
- Wade–Giles: Wan-yen Tsung-han

Nianhan (Jurchen name)
- Traditional Chinese: 粘罕
- Simplified Chinese: 粘罕
Transcriptions
Standard Mandarin
- Hanyu Pinyin: Niánhǎn
- Wade–Giles: Nien-han

Wanyan Zonghan (1080–1136), Jurchen name Nianhan, posthumous name Prince Huanzhong of Qin (秦桓忠王), was a noble and military general of China's Jurchen-led Jin dynasty.

== Life ==
Nianhan was the eldest son of Sagai (撒改) and a great-grandson of Wugunai, the chief of the Wanyan tribe. He was a relative of Aguda (Emperor Taizu), the founder of the Jin dynasty, because Aguda was Sagai's cousin and Wugunai's grandson.

Nianhan served as one of Aguda's chief advisers in the Jurchen rebellion against the Khitan-led Liao dynasty in 1114. He participated in the ensuing war between the Jurchens and Khitans that led to the destruction of the Liao dynasty and its replacement by the Jin dynasty. Under Aguda's successor, Wuqimai (Emperor Taizong), Zhanhan played a major role in the wars against the Song dynasty. During the campaign of 1125-1126, he was the "left vice-marshal": the commander the Jurchen Western Army, which invaded Shanxi Province and besieged Taiyuan, while the Eastern Army, led by the "right vice-marshal" Wolibu (斡離不), was besieging Bianjing (present-day Kaifeng).

When the war against the Song dynasty resumed in 1126, Nianhan, who had taken Taiyuan, joined Wolibu at the walls of Bianjing. Together the two armies besieged the Song capital for a month, conquered it on January 9, 1127, captured the Song emperors Huizong and Qinzong, and returned to the Jin capital, Huining Prefecture (present-day Acheng District, Harbin), with their prisoners and loot.

Nianhan continued to be influential throughout Emperor Taizong's reign. He, along with Wanyan Xiyin, was instrumental in persuading Emperor Taizong to bequeath the throne to Aguda's son, Hela (later Emperor Xizong), rather than to his own son, Puluhu (Wanyan Zongpan).

Like other top Jurchen generals, during Emperor Taizong's reign, Nianhan was able to run a portion of the empire as a semi-independent warlord, running his own government in Shanxi Province. However, he lost his military power during Emperor Xizong's drive to centralise the control of the empire in the hands of the central bureaucracy, and in 1135 was transferred to a position in the central government.

== Commemoration ==
Mounted statues of Nianhan and Aguda have been erected on the grounds of the Jin Dynasty Shangjing History Museum (金上京历史博物馆) at the site of the old Jin capital, Shangjing, near present-day Acheng District, Harbin, Heilongjiang Province.

== See also ==
- Jin–Song Wars

== Sources ==
- Franke, Herbert, 1997 (I): "Chinese Texts on the Jurchen (I): a Translation of the Jurchen in the San ch'ao pei-meng hui-pien. Originally published in Zantralasiatische Studien 9. Wiesbaden, 1975. Reprinted in: Herbert Franke and Hok-lam Chan, "Studies on the Jurchens and the Chin Dynasty", Variorum Collected Series Studies: CS591, Ashgate, 1997. ISBN 0-86078-645-5. (The work whose name is transcribed in Wade-Giles as San ch'ao pei-meng hui-pien is Xu Mengxin's (徐夢莘) "Collected Accounts of the Treaties with the North under Three Reigns" (三朝北盟会编, pinyin: San chao beimeng huibian). Franke translates and comments on Chapter 3 of this collection, which deals with the history and customs of the Jurchen people).
- (CHT) The Cambridge History of China, vol. 6.
- Tao, Jing-shen, "The Jurchen in Twelfth-Century China". University of Washington Press, 1976, ISBN 0-295-95514-7.
- Toqto'a (c. 1343). History of Jin. Vol. 2.
