= Chinese Banking Liquidity Crisis of 2013 =

The Chinese Banking Liquidity Crisis of 2013 was a sudden credit crunch affecting China's commercial banks evidenced by a rapid rise on 20 June 2013 in the Shanghai interbank overnight lending rates to a high of 30 percent from its usual rate of less than 3%. The ensuing panic affected gold markets and stock. China's regulation of the foreign exchange market had caused a decline in inflow of cash. On 19 June 2013, instead of injecting additional funds and easing its monetary policy, China's central bank People's Bank of China (PBOC) told commercial banks to "make full use of incremental funds and revitalize stock options." On 24 June 2014 the PBOC told commercial banks to "control the risk associated with credit expansion" effectively increasing the scrutiny of shadow banks' lending practices. This resulted in a sudden shortfall in the cash market resulting in short term repo rates in excess of 25%. In effect China was using market forces to manage the economy.

== Context ==
China's 2008 monetary stimulus package contributed to China's subsequent economic boom. By 2011 China's local government debts was already under scrutiny from national regulators. There were concerns even that the "massive, shady trade" in over-the-counter credit could place China's financial security and social stability, at risk. By 2011 half of the loans in China were in shadow banking with no regulatory scrutiny. In March 2013 Li Keqiang, an economist by training, was elected as Premier. In 2010 Li Keqiang had called for a global governance structure that was "more reflective of the changes in the global political and economic landscape." By 2013 China was concerned about shadow banking, which includes hedge fund, private financing, trust loans, private funds and other non-bank financial institutions.

A Bank of America Merrill Lynch Global Research report published in January 2014 cautioned that "local government financing vehicles and shadow banking" remained a concern and if not addressed could lead to costly defaults.

== Market Reaction ==
Following PBOC intervention in June 2013, the loss of liquidity from shadow banks caused the blue-chip Shanghai Composite Index (CSI300) to plummet 5.3% the largest daily decline in nearly 4 years. As result, the credit rating agency Moody's issued a warning on Chinese and Hong Kong debt obligations.

== PBOC Reaction ==
Following the market's reaction, the PBOC refused to inject additional funds to cover the liquidity shortfall implying a dramatic policy change from rapid growth to quality growth. Analysts predict the sudden tightening of lending rates served as a warning to overzealous banks to control their lending practices.
