= Emperor Huizong of Song =

Emperor of China from 1100 to 1126

Emperor Huizong of Song 宋徽宗
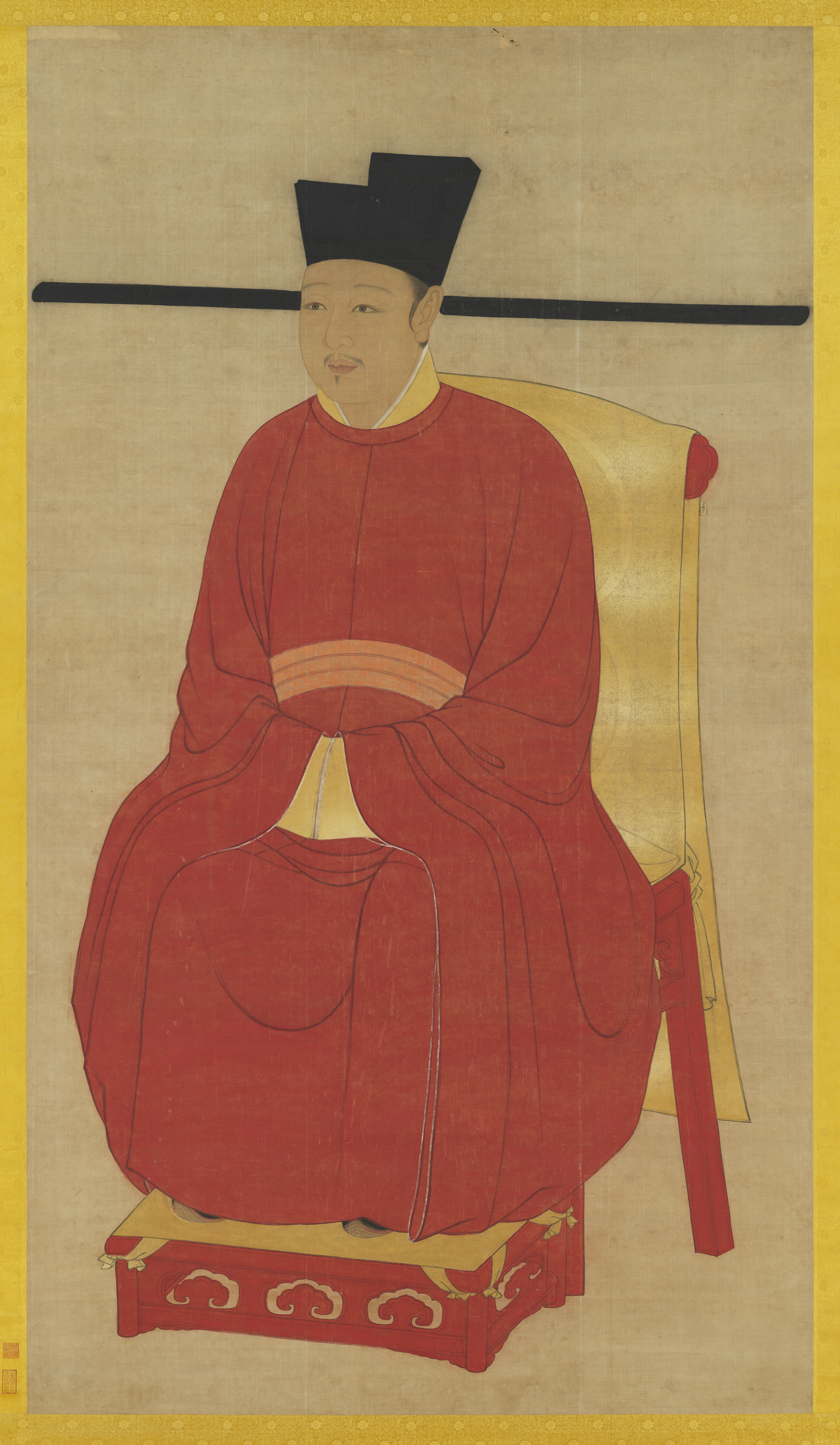
- Palace portrait of Emperor Huizong, on a hanging scroll, kept in the National Palace Museum, Taipei, Taiwan

Emperor of the Song dynasty
- Reign: 23 February 1100 – 18 January 1126
- Coronation: 23 February 1100
- Predecessor: Emperor Zhezong
- Successor: Emperor Qinzong
- Born: Zhao Ji (趙佶); 2 November 1082; Bianliang, Song dynasty (present-day Kaifeng, Henan, China)
- Died: 4 June 1135 (aged 52); Wuguocheng, Jin dynasty (present-day Yilan County, Heilongjiang, China)
- Burial: 1142; Yongyou Mausoleum (永祐陵, in present-day Shaoxing, Zhejiang)
- Consorts: Empress Xiangong (died 1108) Empress Xiansu (died 1131) Empress Mingda (died 1113) Empress Mingjie (died 1121) Empress Xianren (before 1135)
- Issue Detail: Emperor Qinzong; Emperor Gaozong; Princess Jiade
Era dates
- Jianzhongjingguo (建中靖國; 1101); Chongning (崇寧; 1102–1106); Daguan (大觀; 1107–1110); Zhenghe (政和; 1111 – October 1118); Chonghe (重和; November 1118 – February 1119); Xuanhe (宣和; February 1119 – 1125)
Regnal name
- Emperor Jiaozhu Daojun (教主道君皇帝)
Posthumous name
- Emperor Tishen Hedao Junlie Xungong Shengwen Rende Xianci Xianxiao (體神合道駿烈遜功聖文仁德憲慈顯孝皇帝) (conferred in 1143)
Temple name
- Huizong (徽宗)
- House: Zhao
- Dynasty: Song (Northern Song)
- Father: Emperor Shenzong
- Mother: Empress Qinci
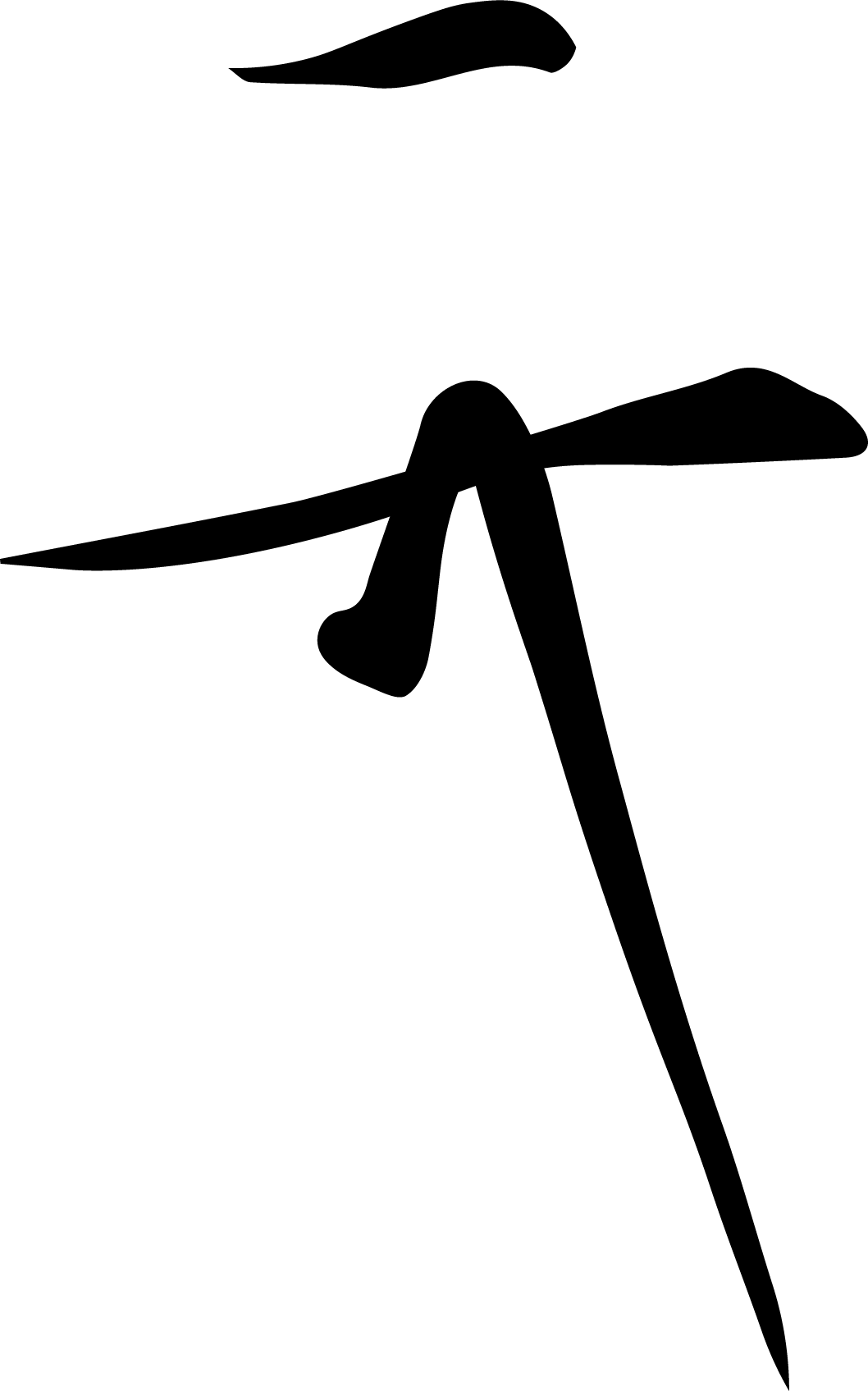
- Huaya

Emperor Huizong of Song
- Chinese: 宋徽宗
- Literal meaning: "Fine/beautiful Ancestor of the Song"
Transcriptions
Standard Mandarin
- Hanyu Pinyin: Sòng Huīzōng

Zhao Ji
- Traditional Chinese: 趙佶
- Simplified Chinese: 赵佶
Transcriptions
Standard Mandarin
- Hanyu Pinyin: Zhào Jí

Duke Hunde
- Chinese: 昏德公
- Literal meaning: Besotted Duke
Transcriptions
Standard Mandarin
- Hanyu Pinyin: Hūndé Gōng

Emperor Huizong of Song (2 November 1082 – 4 June 1135), personal name Zhao Ji, was the eighth emperor of the Song dynasty of China. The 11th son of Emperor Shenzong, he ascended the throne in 1100 following the death of his elder brother, Emperor Zhezong. His court was marked by the dominance of Cai Jing, Wang Fu, Zhu Mian, and the eunuchs Li Yan, Tong Guan, and Liang Shicheng, collectively denounced by Chen Dong as the "Six Thieves". He expanded social welfare programs but also pursued a lavish lifestyle, notably through the "flower-and-stone fleet", which transported rarities requisitioned from Jiangnan to the capital Bianjing, contributing to the Fang La uprising. Huizong promoted Taoism while suppressing Buddhism. He allied with the Jin dynasty against the Liao dynasty, but after the Jin conquered the Liao and invaded Song territory, Huizong abdicated in favor of his eldest son, Emperor Qinzong, in 1126. The following year, Jin forces captured Bianjing and took Huizong, Qinzong, and much of the imperial family captive in the Jingkang Incident, marking the end of the Northern Song dynasty. The Emperor Taizong of Jin gave Huizong a title, Duke Hunde (literally "Besotted Duke"), to humiliate him. Huizong died in Wuguocheng after nearly a decade in captivity.

Despite his political failures, Huizong was an accomplished painter, poet, calligrapher, and musician, as well as a major patron of the arts. His imperial collection included more than 6,000 paintings.

== Biography ==
Emperor Huizong, besides his partaking in state affairs that favoured the reformist party that supported Wang Anshi's New Policies, was a cultured leader who spent much of his time admiring the arts. He was a collector of paintings, calligraphy, and antiques of previous dynasties, building huge collections of each for his amusement. He wrote poems of his own, was known as an avid painter, created his own calligraphy style, had interests in architecture and garden design, and even wrote treatises on medicine and Taoism. He assembled an entourage of painters that were first pre-screened in an examination to enter as official artists of the imperial court, and made reforms to court music. Like many learned men of his age, he was quite a polymath personality, and is even considered to be one of the greatest Chinese artists of all time. He constantly proclaimed legitimacy through cultural, religious, and artistic means. In 1106, he had artisans recast of the symbolic Nine Tripod Cauldrons to assert his authority. However, his reign would be forever scarred by the decisions made (by counsel he received) on handling foreign policies, as the end of his reign marked a period of disaster for the Song Empire.

=== Taxation ===
According to historian Chen Fuliang (1137–1203), during the Xuanhe period of Emperor Huizong, various educational and other taxes were merged into the jingzhi tax. In the Shaoxing period, over twenty taxes were combined into the zongzhi tax, including real estate and other specific taxes. Various taxes were allocated for monthly spending. In installments, the government reduced grain costs, required loans repaid in cash, increased marketplace taxes, and provided bureaucratic payments. Officials continued Xuanhe period taxes after his reign and benefited from the zongzhi tax for military spending.

=== Jurchen Invasion ===
When the Jurchens founded the Jin Dynasty and attacked the Liao dynasty to the north of the Song, the Song dynasty allied with the Jin Dynasty and attacked the Liao from the south in 1122. Led by Tong Guan, the Song army marched to the Song-Liao border and was stopped by the defensive forest that the Song had maintained since the reign of Emperor Taizu. In order to pass through, Tong Guan ordered the soldiers to clear the forest and continued the expedition into the Liao. This expedition succeeded in destroying the Liao, a longtime enemy of the Song. However, when the Jin attacked the Song a few years later, the Jin troops marched through a defenseless border and quickly gathered around the Song capital Kaifeng.

=== Abdication ===
However, an even more formidable Jin dynasty enemy was now on the northern border. Not content with the annexation of the Liao domain, and perceiving the weakness of the Song army, the Jurchens soon declared war on their former ally, and by the beginning of 1126, the troops of the Jin "Western Vice-Marshal" Wolibu crossed the Yellow River and came in sight of Bianjing, the capital of the Song Empire. Realizing his mistakes, Huizong took the blame for everything that went wrong and was stricken with panic, Emperor Huizong intended to flee but was convinced by his officials to abdicate first and then flee. Huizong then feigned a stroke because Huizong in his words said that "I must use the excuse of illness. I am afraid of disorder breaking out." He then abdicated on 18 January 1126 in favour of his eldest son, Zhao Huan who is historically now known as Emperor Qinzong (欽宗).

However, Qinzong sternly refused the throne, even pushing the robes off. Huizong, still feigning a stroke, wrote with his left hand "If you do not accept, you are unfilial." Qinzong said, "If I accept, then I am unfilial." Even when Huizong summoned his empress, Qinzong still declined until Huizong ordered his eunuchs to forcibly put him on the throne. Qinzong finally gave in eventually accepting the throne. Huizong then departed the capital to flee in the countryside.

== Capture ==
Pigeon on a Peach Branch (桃鳩圖, 桃鳩図), by Emperor Huizong

Overcoming the walls of Bianjing was a difficult undertaking for the Jurchen cavalry, and this, together with fierce resistance from some Song officials who had not totally lost their nerve, as Emperor Huizong had, and Qinzong giving a town, resulted in the Jurchens lifting the siege of Bianjing and returning north. The Song Empire, however, had to sign a humiliating treaty with the Jin Empire, agreeing to pay a colossal war indemnity and to give a tribute to the Jurchens every year. From 1126 until 1138, refugees from the Song Empire migrated south towards the Yangtze River. Huizong returned from the countryside and resumed his normal activities after hearing that the siege was lifted although he was effectively under house arrest by Qinzong.

But even such humiliating terms could not save the Song dynasty. Within a matter of months, the troops of both Jurchen vice-marshals, Wolibu and Nianhan, were back south again, and this time they were determined to overcome the walls of Bianjing after Qinzong wanted to form an Anti-Jin alliance with two Liao nobles who were actually on the Jurchens side. After a bitter siege, the Jurchens eventually entered Bianjing on 9 January 1127, and many days of looting, rapes, and massacre followed. Most of the entire imperial court and harem were captured by the Jurchens in an event known historically as the Jingkang Incident, and transported north, mostly to the Jin capital of Shangjing (in present-day Harbin). After Qinzong was captured, Emperor Huizong was persuaded to turn himself in, however they captured Huizong. When Huizong got to see Qinzong, they cried and hugged each other with Huizong stating "If you had listened to the old man, we would have avoided this disaster."

One of the many sons of Emperor Huizong, Zhao Gou was not present in Bianjing where he went to Southern China where, after many years of struggle, he would establish the Southern Song Dynasty, of which he was the first ruler, Emperor Gaozong.

Emperors Huizong and the former Emperor Qinzong were demoted to the rank of commoners by the Jurchens on 20 March 1127. Then on 10 May 1127, Emperor Huizong was deported to Heilongjiang, where he spent the last eight years of his life as a captive. In 1128, in a humiliating episode, the two former Song Emperors had to venerate the Jin ancestors at their shrine in Shangjing, wearing mourning dress. The Jurchen ruler, Emperor Taizong, granted the two former Song emperors degrading titles to humiliate them: Emperor Huizong was called "Duke Hunde" (昏德公; literally "Besotted Duke") while Emperor Qinzong was called "Marquis Chonghun" (重昏侯; literally "Doubly Besotted Marquis").

The Song male Chinese princes who were captured were given Khitan women to marry from the Liao dynasty palace by the Jin Jurchens, who had also defeated and conquered the Khitan. The original Chinese wives of the Song princes were abducted and the Song princes then married Khitan royal women. One of the Song Emperor Huizong's sons was given a Khitan consort from the Liao palace and another one of his sons was given a Khitan princess by the Jin at the Jin Supreme capital. The Jin Jurchens continued to give new wives to the captured Song royals, the grandsons and sons of Song Emperor Huizong after they took away their original Chinese wives. The Jin Jurchens told the Chinese Song royals that they were fortunate because the Liao Khitan royals were being treated much worse by the Jurchen than the Song Chinese royals. Jurchen soldiers were given the children of the Liao Khitan Tianzuo Emperor as gifts while the Song Emperor was allowed to keep his children while he was in captivity.

In 1137, the Jin Empire formally notified the Southern Song Empire about the death of the former Emperor Huizong. Emperor Huizong, who had lived in opulence and art for the first half of his life, died a broken man in faraway northern Heilongjiang in June 1135, at the age of 52.

A few years later (1141), as the peace negotiations leading up to the Treaty of Shaoxing between the Jin and the Song empires were proceeding, the Jin Empire posthumously honored the former Emperor Huizong with the neutral-sounding title of "Prince of Tianshui Commandery" (天水郡王), after a commandery Tianshui in the upper reaches of the Wei River, which is the traditional Junwang) of the surname Zhao.

== Art, calligraphy, music, and culture ==
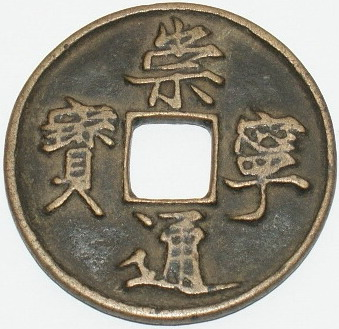
"Chong Ning Tongbao" in the style of Emperor Huizong's Slender Gold calligraphy.

Emperor Huizong was a great painter, poet, and calligrapher. He was also a player of the guqin (as exemplified by his famous painting Listening to the qin 聽琴圖); he also had a Wanqin Tang (萬琴堂; "10,000 Qin Hall") in his palace.

The emperor took huge efforts to search for art masters. He established the "Hanlin Huayuan" (翰林畫院; "Hanlin imperial painting house") where top painters around China shared their best works.

The primary subjects of his paintings are birds and flowers. Among his works is Five-Colored Parakeet on Blossoming Apricot Tree. He also recopied Zhang Xuan's painting Court Ladies Preparing Newly Woven Silk, and Emperor Huizong's reproduction is the only copy of that painting that survives today.

Emperor Huizong invented the "Slender Gold" (瘦金體) style of calligraphy. The name "Slender Gold" came from the fact that the emperor's writing resembled the way gold filaments twisted and turned, also inspired by Li Yu who called his calligraphy "Golden Inlaid Dagger" (金錯刀). Some theories posits his technique probably based on calligraphy works by Chu Suiliang, Xue Ji or Huang Tingjian.

One of the emperor's era names, Xuanhe, is also used to describe a style of mounting paintings in scroll format. In this style, black borders are added between some of the silk planes.

In 1114, following a request from the Goryeo ruler Yejong, Emperor Huizong sent to the palace in the Goryeo capital at Gaeseong a set of musical instruments to be used for royal banquet music. Two years later, in 1116, he sent another, even larger gift of musical instruments (numbering 428 in total) to the Goryeo court, this time yayue instruments, beginning that nation's tradition of aak.

Emperor Huizong was also a great tea enthusiast. He wrote the Treatise on Tea, the most detailed and masterful description of the Song sophisticated style of tea ceremony.

Zhao Mengfu was a famous descendant of Emperor Huizong through his daughter Zhao Jinluo.

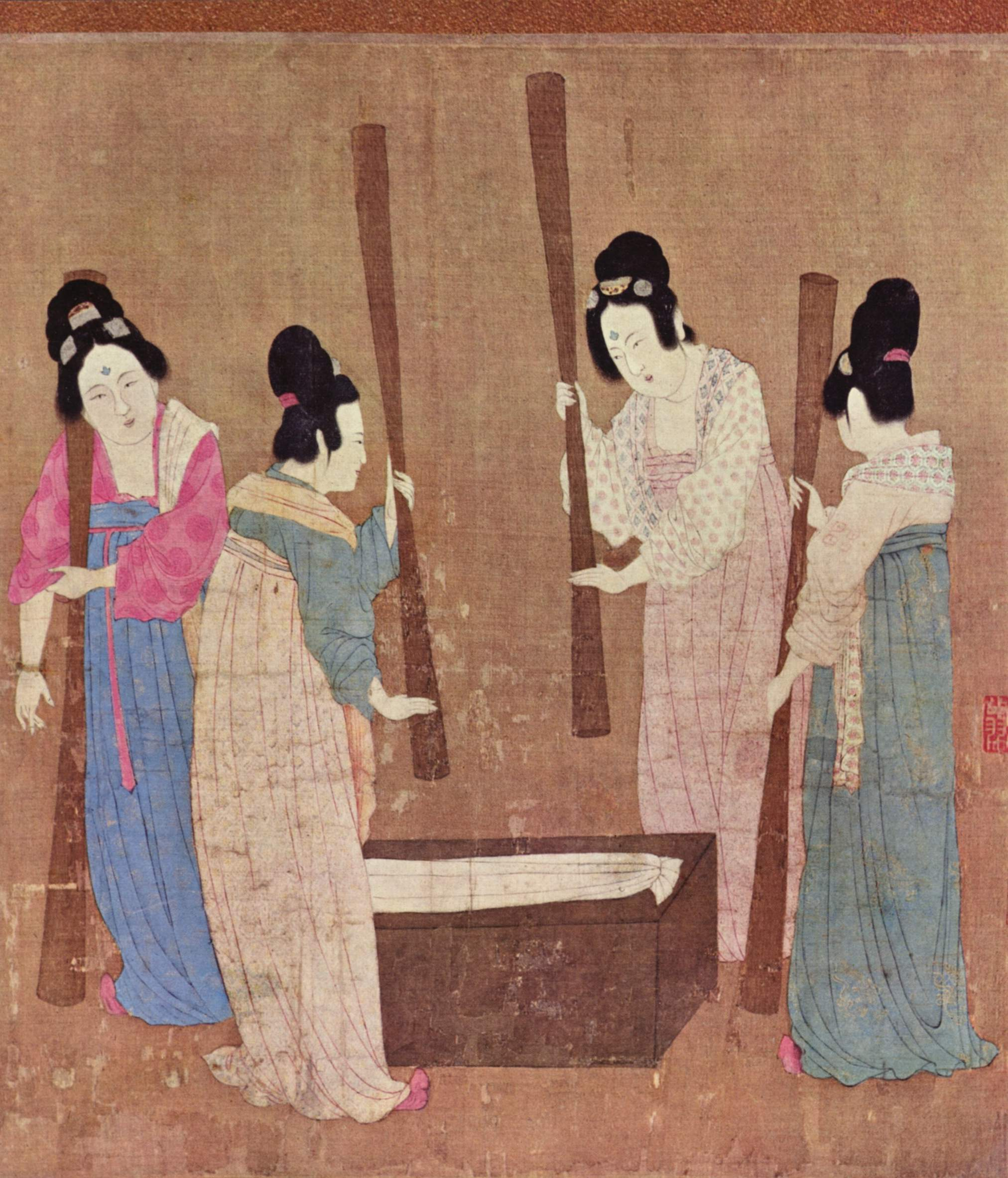
Women preparing silk, a Chinese silk painting by Emperor Huizong of Song, early 12th century.

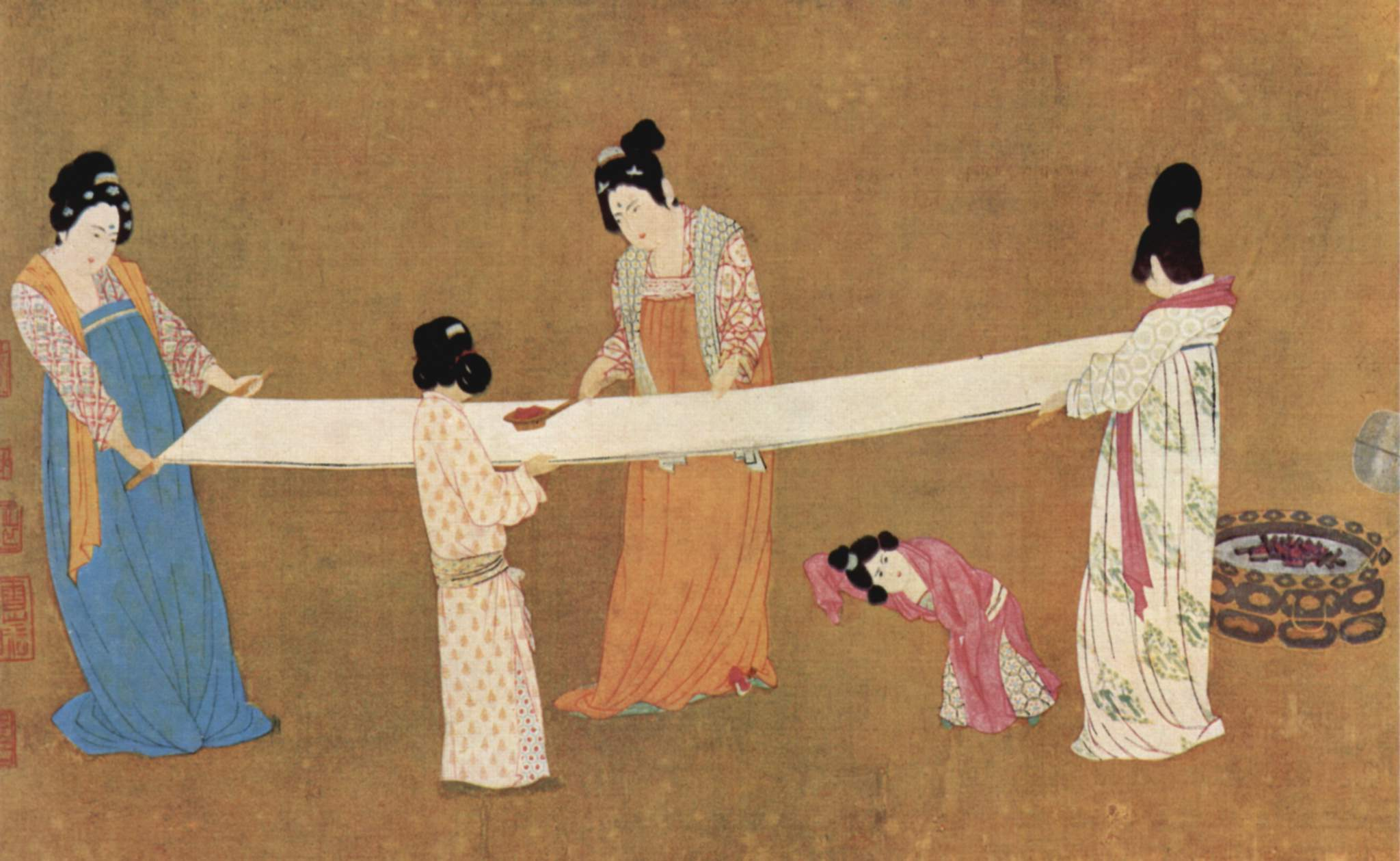
Emperor Huizong of Song, Ladies making silk, (a remake of an 8th-century original by artist Zhang Xuan)

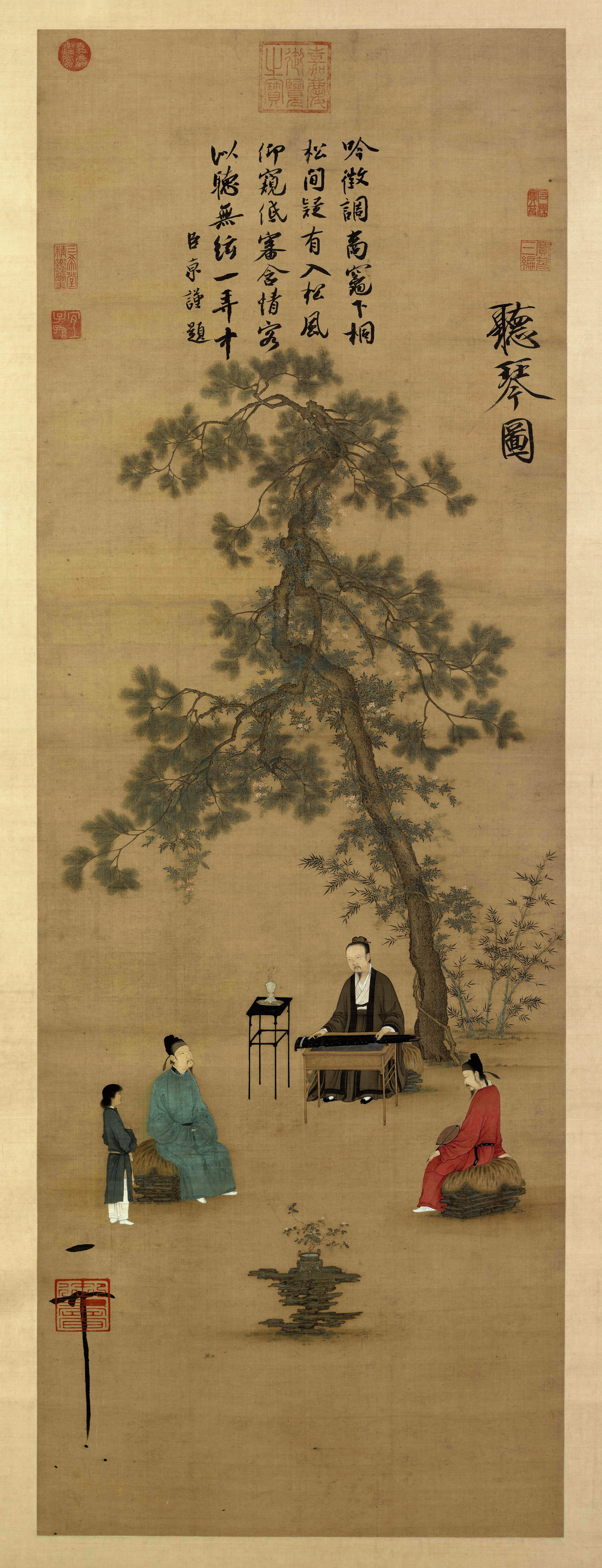
Emperor Huizong of Song, Listening to the qin (Chinese: Ting Qin Tu, 聽琴圖)

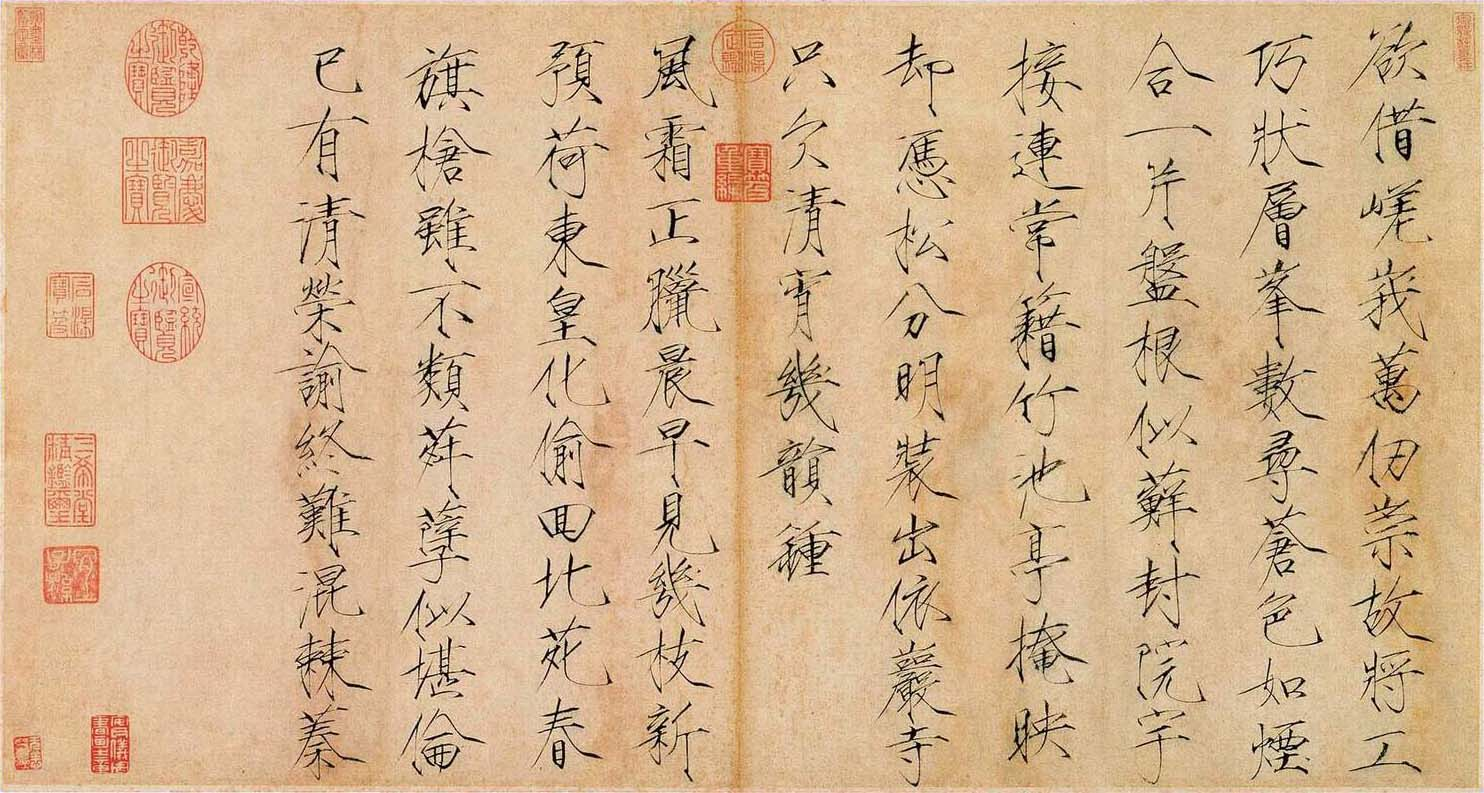
Emperor Huizong of Song (Poem and Calligraphy)

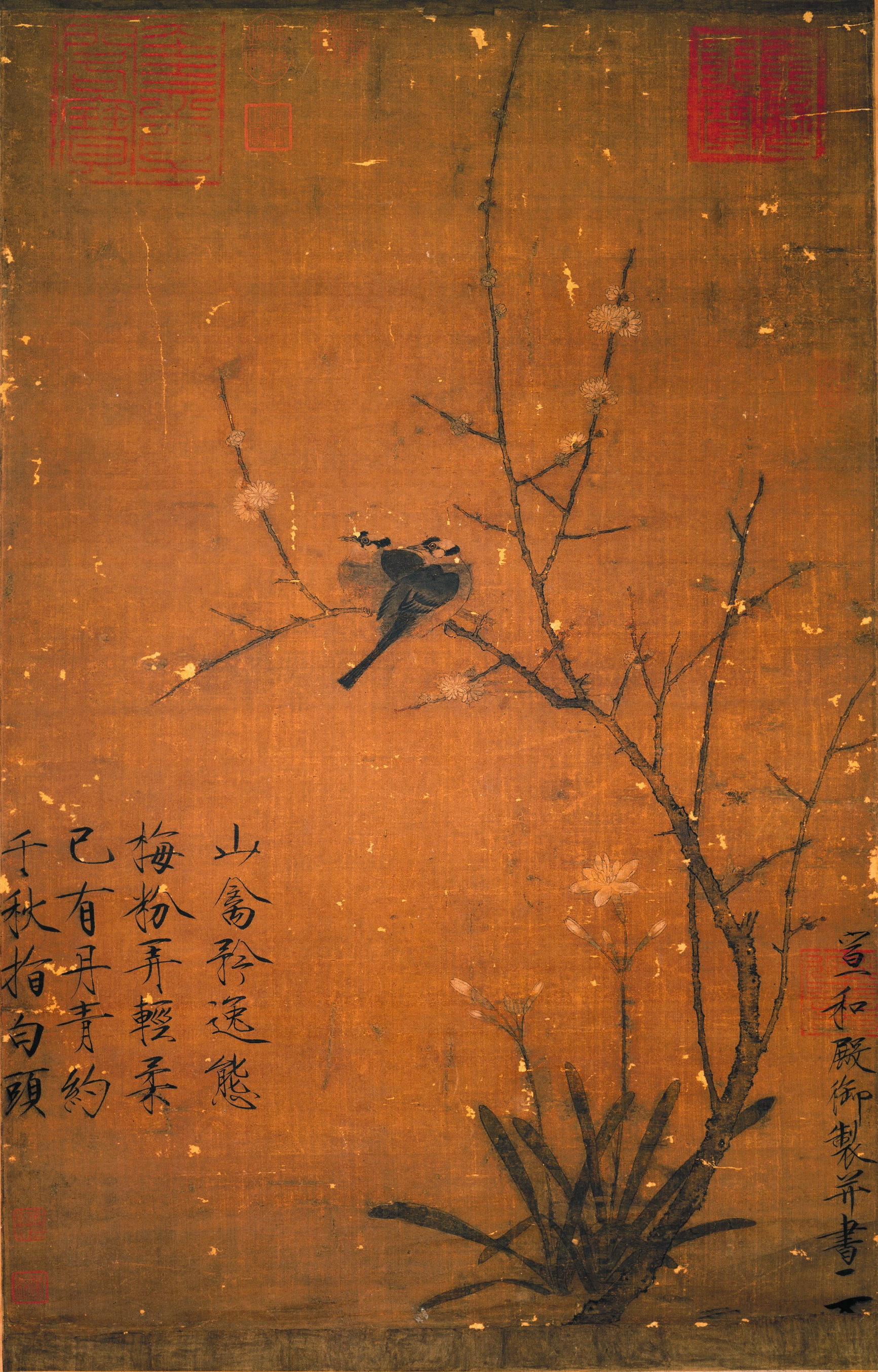
Emperor Huizong of Song, Plum and Birds

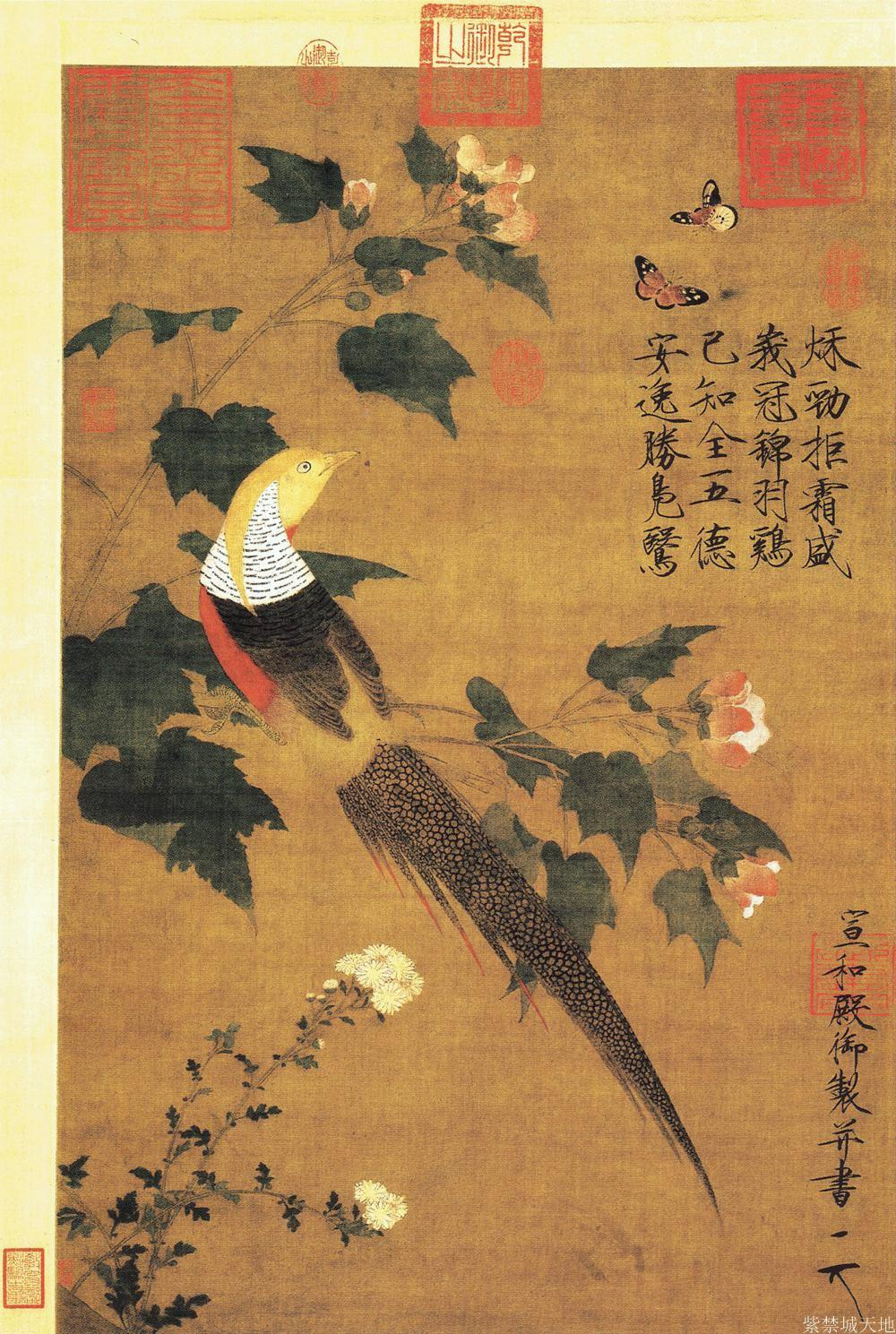
Emperor Huizong of Song, Golden Pheasant and Cotton Rose Flowers

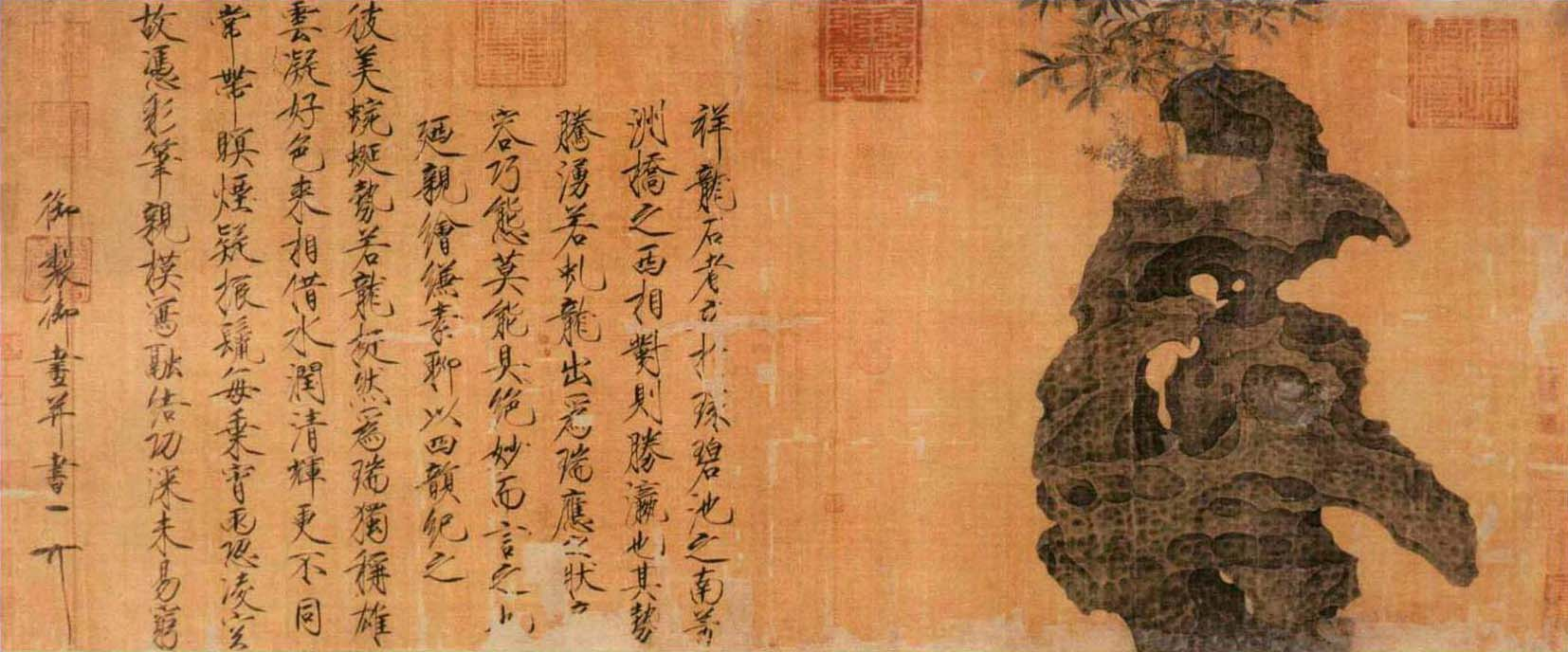
Emperor Huizong of Song, Dragon Stone

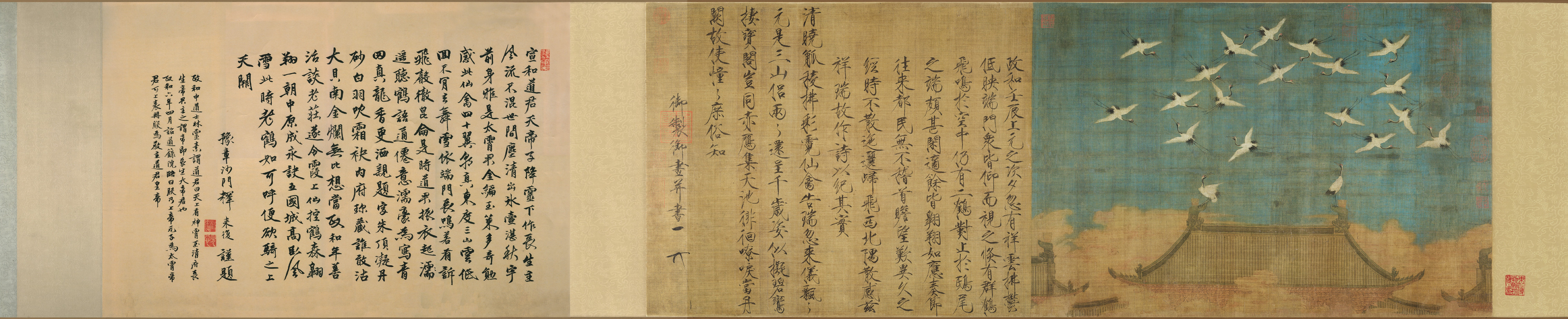
Emperor Huizong of Song, Cranes 1112

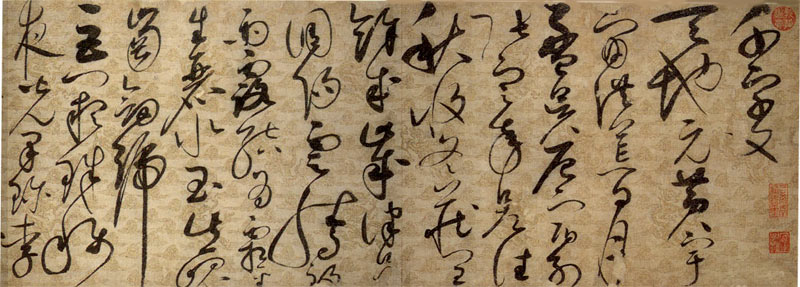
Emperor Huizong of Song, Thousand character classic in cursive script

== Legacy ==
The painter Zeng Fanzhi regards Listening to the Qin as "the most beautiful painting from the Song dynasty. For more than 10 years, I've been observing the beauty of the pine tree in that painting."

== Family ==
- Empress Xiangong, of the Wang clan (顯恭皇后 王氏; 1084–1108)
  - Zhao Huan, Qinzong (欽宗 趙桓; 1100–1156), first son
  - Princess Rongde (榮德帝姬; b. 1103), personal name Jinnu (金奴), second (second) daughter
    - Married Cao Cheng (曹晟; 1104–1127) in 1115
    - Married Wanyan Chang (完顏昌; d. 1139) in 1127 and had issue (1 son)
    - Married Wanyan Dan (1119–1150) in 1139
- Empress Xiansu, of the Zheng clan (顯肅皇后 鄭氏; 1079–1131)
  - Princess Jiade (嘉德帝姬; 1100–1141), personal name Yupan (玉盤), first (first) daughter
    - Married Ceng Yin (曾夤; b. 1100) in 1115, and had issue (two daughters)
    - Married Wanyan Zongpan (完顏宗磐; d. 1139), the first son of Wanyan Sheng, in 1127, and had issue (1 sons)
    - Married Wanyan Dan (1119–1150) in 1139
  - Zhao Cheng, Prince of Yan (兗王 趙檉; 1101), second son
  - Princess Shoushu (壽淑帝姬), fourth daughter
  - Princess Ande (安德帝姬; 1106–1127), personal name Jinluo (金羅), eighth (third) daughter
    - Married Song Bangguang (宋邦光; b. 1106), and had issue (one daughter)
    - Married Wanyan Dumu (完顏阇母; 1090–1129), the 11th son of Wanyan Helibo, in 1127
  - Princess Rongshu (榮淑帝姬), 11th daughter
  - Princess Chengde (成德帝姬; b. 1110), personal name Hu'er (瑚兒), 13th (fifth) daughter
    - Married Xiang Zifang (向子房; b. 1110)
- Empress Mingda, of the Liu clan (明達皇后 劉氏; d. 1113)
  - Princess Anshu (安淑帝姬), sixth daughter
  - Princess Maode (茂德帝姬; 1106–1128), personal name Fujin (福金), ninth (fourth) daughter
    - Married Cai Tiao (蔡鞗; b. 1107), the fifth son of Cai Jing, in 1120, and had issue (one son)
    - Married Wanyan Zongwang (完顏宗望; d. 1127), the second son of Wanyan Min, in 1127
    - Married Wanyan Xiyin (d. 1140) in 1127
  - Zhao Yu, Prince of Yi (益王 趙棫; 1107–1137), eighth son
  - Zhao Mo, Prince of Qi (祁王 趙模; 1107–1138), 11th son
  - Princess Xunde (洵德帝姬; b. 1110), personal name Fujin (富金), 14th (sixth) daughter
    - Married Tian Pi (田丕; b. 1110)
    - Married Wanyan Sheyema (完顏設也馬), the first son of Wanyan Zonghan, in 1127
  - Zhao Zhen, Prince of Xin (信王 趙榛; 1111–1139), 18th son
- Empress Mingjie, of the Liu clan (明節皇后 劉氏; 1088–1121)
  - Zhao Yang, Prince of Jian'an (建安王 趙柍; 1115–1127), 25th son
  - Princess Hefu (和福帝姬; b. 1116), personal name Jinzhu (金珠), 29th (17th) daughter
  - Zhao Yi, Duke of Jia (嘉國公 趙椅; 1118–1130), 26th son
  - Zhao Si, Duke of Ying (英國公 趙楒; b. 1120), 28th son
- Empress Xianren, of the Wei clan (顯仁皇后 韋氏; 1080–1159)
  - Zhao Gou, Gaozong (高宗 趙構; 1111–1187), ninth son
- Noble Consort Yisu, of the Wang clan (懿肅貴妃 王氏; d. 1117)
  - Princess Huishu (惠淑帝姬), fifth daughter
  - Princess Kangshu (康淑帝姬), tenth daughter
  - Zhao Zhi, Prince of Shen (莘王 趙植; 1108–1148), 12th son
  - Princess Shunde (順德帝姬; 1111–1137), personal name Yingluo (纓絡), 18th (eighth) daughter
    - Married Xiang Ziyi (向子扆; b. 1111)
    - Married Wanyan Zonghan (1080–1137) in 1127
    - Married Wanyan Shengunai (完顏什古乃) in 1137
  - Princess Roufu (柔福帝姬; 1111–1142), personal name Huanhuan (嬛嬛), 20th (tenth) daughter
    - Married Wanyan Zongwang (完顏宗望; d. 1127), the second son of Wanyan Min, in 1127
    - Married Wanyan Zongxian (完顏宗賢; d. 1150) in 1127
    - Married Wanyan Sheng (1075–1135) in 1127
    - Married Wanyan Zongxian (完顏宗賢; d. 1150)
    - Married Xu Hai (徐還)
  - Princess Xianfu (賢福帝姬; 1112–1127), personal name Jin'er (金兒), 26th (15th) daughter
  - Zhao Ji, Duke of Chen (陳國公 趙機; 1114), 22nd son
- Noble Consort, of the Wang clan (貴妃 王氏)
  - Zhao Kai, Prince of Yun (鄆王 趙楷; 1101–1130), third son
  - Zhao Ji, Prince of Jing (荊王 趙楫; 1102–1103), fourth son
  - Zhao Shu, Prince of Su (肅王 趙樞; 1103–1130), fifth son
  - Princess Chongde (崇德帝姬; d. 1121), seventh daughter
    - Married Cao Shi (曹湜) in 1119
  - Princess Baoshu (保淑帝姬), 12th daughter
  - Princess Xishu (熙福帝姬), 16th daughter
  - Zhao Di, Prince of Xu (徐王 趙棣; b. 1109), 14th son
  - Zhao Chan, Duke of Xiang (相國公 趙梴; 1112–1137), 23rd son
- Noble Consort, of the Qiao clan (貴妃 喬氏; b. 1081)
  - Zhao Qi, Prince of Jing (景王 趙杞; 1104–1138), sixth son
  - Zhao Xu, Prince of Ji (濟王 趙栩; b. 1106), seventh son
  - Zhao Cai, Prince of Bin (邠王 趙材; 1107–1116), tenth son
  - Zhao Pu, Prince of Yi (儀王 趙樸; 1109–1123), 13th son
  - Zhao Gong, Prince of Yun (鄆王 趙栱; 1110–1112), 16th son
  - Zhao Wo, Prince of Ankang (安康王 趙楃; b. 1112), 20th son
  - Zhao Yue, Duke of Ying (瀛國公 趙樾; 1115–1131), 24th son
  - Princess Huafu (華福帝姬; b. 1119), personal name Saiyue (賽月), 31st (19th) daughter
    - Married Wanyan Dan (1119–1150)
- Noble Consort, of the Cui clan (貴妃 崔氏; 1091–1130)
  - Princess Daomu (悼穆帝姬), personal name Jinxian (金仙), 15th daughter
  - Princess Dunfu (敦福帝姬), personal name Sanjin (三金), 21st daughter
  - Zhao Chun, Prince of Han (漢王 趙椿; 1112–1113), 19th son
  - Princess Renfu (仁福帝姬; 1112–1127), personal name Xiangyun (香雲), 23rd (12th) daughter
  - Princess Yongfu (永福帝姬; b. 1112), personal name Fubao (佛保), 25th (14th) daughter
  - Princess Ningfu (寧福帝姬; b. 1114), personal name Chuanzhu (串珠), 28th (16th) daughter
    - Married Wanyan Zongjuan (完顏宗雋; d. 1139), the sixth son of Wanyan Min, in 1127, and had issue (one son)
    - Married Wanyan Dan (1119–1150) in 1139
- Noble Consort, of the Wang clan (貴妃 王氏; 1092–1127)
  - Zhao E, Prince of Yi (沂王 趙㮙; 1110–1132), 15th son
  - Princess Shenfu (申福帝姬), 27th daughter
- Able Consort, of the Yang clan (賢妃 楊氏; d. 1115)
  - Princess Shunshu (順淑帝姬), third daughter
  - Zhao Shi, Prince of He (和王 趙栻; 1111–1128), 17th son
- Wanrong, of the Wang clan (婉容 王氏), personal name Yuegong (王月宮)
  - Princess Huifu (惠福帝姬 趙珠珠; b. 1112), personal name Zhuzhu (珠珠), 24th (13th) daughter
    - Married Wanyan Xiebao (完顏斜保), the second son of Wanyan Zonghan, in 1127, and had issue (one son)
  - Princess Lingfu (令福帝姬; b. 1118), personal name Jinyin (金印), 30th (18th) daughter
    - Married Wanyan Dan (1119–1150)
  - Zhao Bing, Duke of Chang (昌國公 趙柄; 1122–1132), 30th son
- Wanrong, of the Yan clan (婉容 閻氏; 1109–1133), personal name Baose (寶瑟)
  - Zhao Zhu (趙柱; b. 1130), 34th son
  - Zhao Tieshi (赵铁使), 37th son
- Zhaoyuan, of the Zheng clan (昭媛 鄭氏), personal name Meiniang (媚娘)
  - Zhao Tan (趙檀; b. 1131), 35th son
- Xiurong, of the Han clan (修容 韓氏)
  - Zhao Jian, Prince of Guangping Commandery (廣平郡王 趙楗; b. 1112), 21st son
  - Princess Baofu (保福帝姬; 1112–1127), personal name Xianlang (仙郎), 22nd (11th) daughter
- Jieyu, of the Wang clan (婕妤 王氏)
  - Zhao Ji (趙極; b. 1127), 33rd son
  - Princess Quanfu (全福帝姬), 35th daughter
    - Married Li Dunfu (李敦复)
  - Princess Chunfu (純福帝姬; b. 1124), personal name Jinling (金鈴), 33rd (21st) daughter
    - Married Wanyan Sheyema (完顏設也馬), the first son of Wanyan Zonghan
    - Married Wang Chengdi (王成棣)
- Cairen, of the Qiao clan (才人 喬氏)
  - Princess Xiande (顯德帝姬; b. 1111), personal name Qiaoyun (巧雲), 17th (seventh) daughter
    - Married Liu Wenyan (劉文彥)
- Cairen, of the Shao clan (才人邵氏), personal name Yuannu (元奴)
- Jieyu, of the Wang clan (婕妤 王氏, b. 1105)
  - Zhao Xiang, Duke of Han (韓國公 趙相; b. 1125), 32nd son
- Cairen, of the Di clan (狄才人), personal name Jinnu (金奴)
  - Zhao Wanshu (赵顽使), 36th son
- Cairen, of the Zhou clan (才人 春氏), personal name Chuntao (春桃)
- Unknown
  - Zhao Dong, Duke of Wen (溫國公 趙棟; b. 1119), 27th son
  - Zhao Tong, Duke of Yi (儀國公 趙桐; 1121–1148), 29th son
  - Zhao Cong, Duke of Run (潤國公 趙樅; b. 1123), 31st son
  - Unnamed Prince, 38th son
  - Princess Yifu (儀福帝姬; b. 1111), personal name Yuanzhu (圓珠), 19th (ninth) daughter
    - Married Wanyan Zongbi (d. 1148) and had issue. (one son)
    - Married Wanyan Dan (1119 – 1150)
  - Princess Qingfu (慶福帝姬; b. 1121), personal name Jingu (金姑), 32nd (20th) daughter
    - Married Wanyan Dan (1119–1150)
  - Princess Gongfu (恭福帝姬), personal name Xiaojin (小金), 34th daughter

== See also ==
- Chinese emperors family tree (middle)
- List of emperors of the Song dynasty
- Architecture of the Song dynasty
- Culture of the Song dynasty
- Economy of the Song dynasty
- History of the Song dynasty
- Society of the Song dynasty
- Technology of the Song dynasty

Emperor Huizong of Song House of Zhao Born: November 2 1082 Died: June 4 1135
Regnal titles
Preceded by Emperor Zhezong	Emperor of the Song Dynasty; 1100–1126	Succeeded by Emperor Qinzong
Honorary titles
Vacant Title last held by Emperor Zhaozong of Tang	Retired Emperor of China; 1126–1135	Vacant Title next held by Emperor Gaozong of Song
