= Wanyan Zongwang =

Jin dynasty general

Wanyan Zongwang (1090s-1127), Jurchen name Wolibu, was a noble and general of Jurchen-led Jin dynasty. He was a son of Emperor Taizu of Jin.

== Life ==
In 1121, after Emperor Taizu settled in Yanjing, he appointed Wolu as commander-in-chief and Zongwang as deputy commander. In August 1122, Zongwang led a vanguard army in pursuit of Emperor Tianzuo of Liao toward Shinianyi, where he encountered over 25,000 Liao soldiers. At the time, the Jin army, with only 1,000 soldiers, was surrounded by the Liao army. Zongwang personally led his army to attack the Liao Emperor, and the Liao army was defeated. In December, Zongwang led a vanguard army of 7,000 in an attack on Nanjing of the Liao Dynasty, reaching Juyong Pass. The Liao soldiers were defeated without a fight. In April 1123, he led an army in pursuit of Emperor Tianzuo, reaching the area between Yinshan and Qingzhong. At the time, Emperor Tianzuo led 10,000 troops into Yingzhou. In a decisive battle, Zongwang defeated Tianzuo and captured his son, Yelü Xinilie, and the Heirloom Seal of the Realm.

=== Jingkang Incident ===
In August 1125, Wanyan Zongwang and Wanyan Zonghan proposed an attack on Song dynasty using the Zhang Jue incident as an excuse. In October, Zongwang, commander of the Eastern Route, led an army from Pingzhou to attack Yanshan Prefecture. In December, he defeated Song forces at Baihe and Gubeikou. Song general Guo Yaoshi surrendered, and the Song defenses of Yanshan Prefecture collapsed. Soon, they defeated 30,000 reinforcements sent from Song Zhongshan and 5,000 Song soldiers from Zhending Prefecture, capturing Xunde Prefecture. Wanyan Zonghan, the Left Deputy Marshal of the Western Route, led his army to defeat Daizhou, force Zhongshan to surrender, and approach Taiyuan, but was blocked at Taiyuan. In January 1126, Zongwang's Eastern Army crossed the Yellow River, occupied Huazhou, and attacked the Northern Song capital of Bianjing (Kaifeng). However, they encountered resistance from Li Gang, the guardian of Bianjing, and were unable to capture it. In February, they forced Song to take Zhao Gou and Grand Chancellor Zhang Bangchang hostage and cede the cities of Taiyuan, Zhongshan, and Hejian in exchange for peace. They retreated to Mengyang, defeated Yao Pingzhong's attacking army of tens of thousands, and resumed their accusations of attacking Bianjing. Fearing this, Emperor Qinzong of Song sent an emissary, stating, "We were unaware of this matter and will punish the perpetrators." Zongwang called off the attack, offered Zhao Shu as a hostage, and allowed Zhao Gou to return. Zongwang returned to Shanxi and was promoted to Right Deputy Marshal.

Shortly after, the Jin Dynasty sent Xiao Zhonggong to Song as an emissary and Yelu Yudu as military commander. Emperor Qinzong of Song believed that the two men, former Liao aristocrats, could be lured out and used. He handed a wax-sealed letter to Xiao Zhonggong, ordering him to make Yelu Yudu his inside accomplice. Xiao Zhonggong hurried back to Jin, met with Wanyan Zongwang, and presented the letter. In August, Zongwang used this as an excuse to gather forces and attack Song again. He set out from Baozhou and defeated Song forces in Xiongzhou, Zhongshan, Guangxin, and Jingxing Tianwei. He then returned east, captured Zhending Prefecture, and attacked Bianjing from Zhending. In November, Zongwang reached the Yellow River and forced Wei Prefecture to surrender. The Jin army crossed the Yellow River and occupied Linhe County, Daming County, the Deqing Army, Kaidexue Prefecture, and Zongcheng on both sides of the Yellow River. They reached the gates of Bianjing and joined forces with Left Deputy Marshal Wanyan Zonghan. In the intercalary eleventh month, due to a plot by Guo Jing, Zongwang's generals broke through Bianjing and captured Huizong and Qinzong.

=== Titles ===
He died of illness in June 1127. In 1135, he was made King of Wei. In 1143, he was promoted to King of Xu and later King of Jin. In 1150, he was made Grand Preceptor and bestowed the title of King of Liao and Yan, and enshrined in the Taizong Temple. In 1157, he was demoted according to custom. In 1163, he was made King of Song and given the posthumous name Huan Su.
