= Emperor Taizong of Jin =

Emperor of Jin from 1123 to 1135

Emperor Taizong of Jin 金太宗
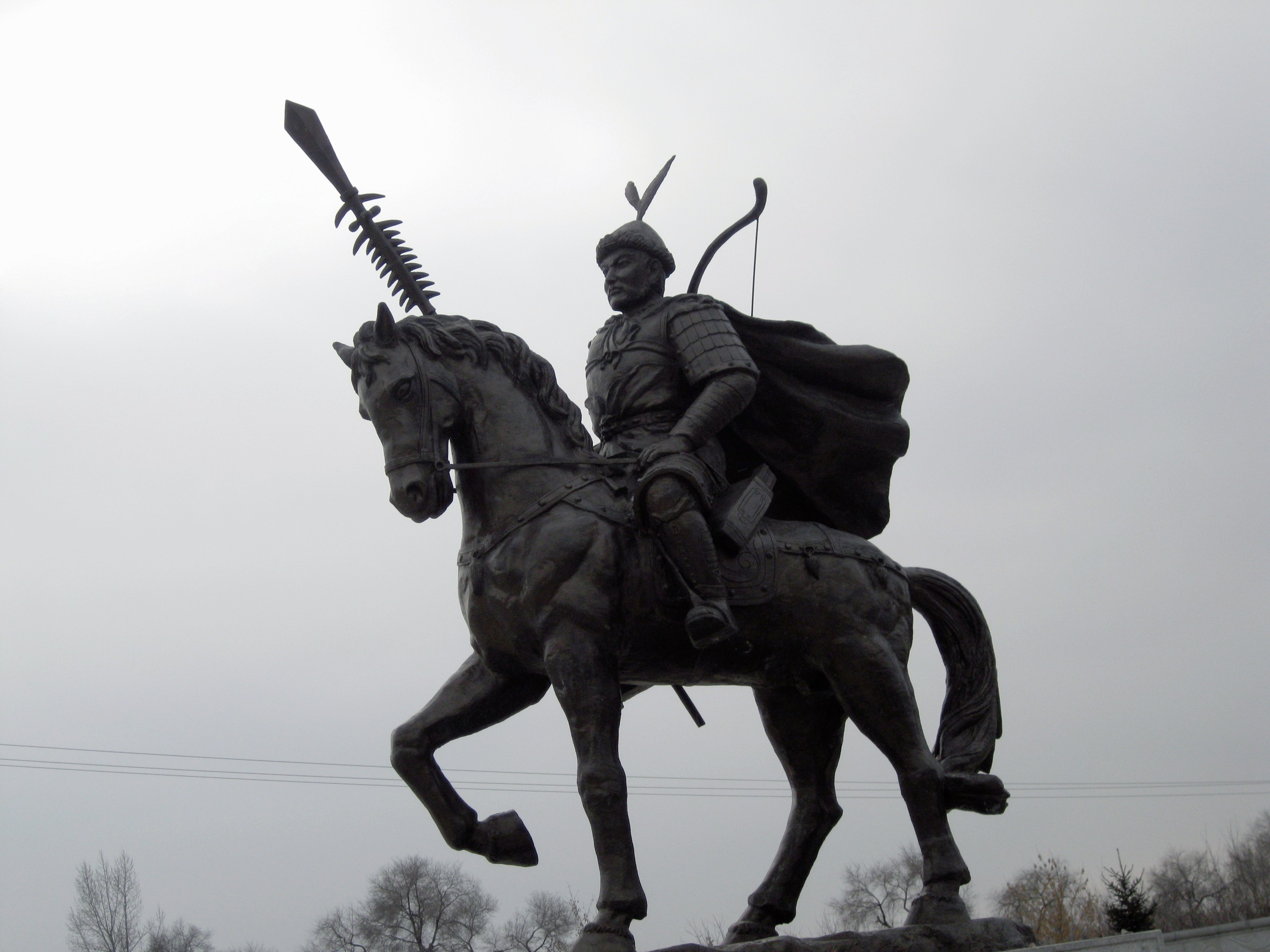

Emperor of the Jin dynasty
- Reign: 27 September 1123 – 9 February 1135
- Predecessor: Emperor Taizu of Jin
- Successor: Emperor Xizong of Jin
- Born: 25 November 1075
- Died: 9 February 1135 (aged 59)
- Burial: Gong Mausoleum (恭陵, in present-day Fangshan District, Beijing)
- Spouse: Empress Qinren
- Issue: See § Family
Names
- Sinicised name: Wanyan Sheng (完顏晟); Jurchen name: Wuqimai (吳乞買)
Era name and dates
- Tianhui (天會): 1123–1135
Posthumous name
- Emperor Tiyuan Yingyun Shide Zhaogong Zhehui Rensheng Wenlie (體元應運世德昭功哲惠仁聖文烈皇帝)
Temple name
- Taizong (太宗)
- House: Wanyan
- Dynasty: Jin
- Father: Wanyan Helibo
- Mother: Lady Nalan

Emperor Taizong of Jin
- Chinese: 金太宗
Transcriptions
Standard Mandarin
- Hanyu Pinyin: Jīn Tàizōng
- Wade–Giles: Chin T'ai-tsung

Wuqimai
- Traditional Chinese: 吳乞買
- Simplified Chinese: 吴乞买
Transcriptions
Standard Mandarin
- Hanyu Pinyin: Wányán Wúqímǎi

Wanyan Sheng
- Traditional Chinese: 完顏晟
- Simplified Chinese: 完颜晟
Transcriptions
Standard Mandarin
- Hanyu Pinyin: Wányán Shèng

Emperor Taizong of Jin (25 November 1075 – 9 February 1135), personal name Wuqimai, sinicised name Wanyan Sheng, was the second emperor of the Jurchen-led Jin dynasty of China. His era name was Tianhui (天會). During his reign, the Jin dynasty conquered the Khitan-led Liao dynasty. He then led the Jin in their campaigns against the Song dynasty, captured the Northern Song capital in 1127 and went on to rule most of northern China. After his death, he was posthumously honoured with the temple name Taizong by his successor, Emperor Xizong.

== Life ==
Wuqimai was the fourth son of Helibo and his primary consort, Lady Nalan (拏懒氏). He was a younger brother of Aguda (Emperor Taizu), the founder and first emperor of the Jin dynasty. He succeeded his brother in 1123. Two years later, the Jin general Wanyan Loushi (完顏婁室) led forces to attack the Khitan-led Liao dynasty and succeeded in capturing Emperor Tianzuo, the last Liao ruler, thereby ending the Liao dynasty's existence.

In October 1125, Emperor Taizong waged war against the Han Chinese-led Song dynasty and ordered his fifth brother, Wanyan Gao (完顏杲), to lead the Jin armies to attack Bianjing (present-day Kaifeng, Henan Province), the Song capital, from two different directions. The Song general Li Gang (李綱) led fierce resistance against the Jin invaders. After some time, the Jin and Song dynasties agreed to a truce. In August 1126, Emperor Taizong ordered Wanyan Zongwang (完顏宗望) and Wanyan Zonghan to lead Jin forces to attack and besiege Bianjing again. This time, the Jin dynasty not only conquered Bianjing, but also captured Emperors Huizong and Qinzong of the Song dynasty. This event, historically known as the Jingkang Incident, marked the end of the Northern Song dynasty and beginning of the Southern Song dynasty.

In 1128, Emperor Taizong gave ironic titles of nobility to the two captured former Song emperors; Emperor Huizong was called "Duke Hunde" (昏德公; literally "Besotted Duke") while Emperor Qinzong was called "Marquis Chonghun" (重昏侯; literally "Doubly Besotted Marquis"). They were resettled in Wuguocheng (五國城; in present-day Yilan County, Heilongjiang Province).

During his reign, Emperor Taizong laid and strengthened the Jin dynasty's political system and institutions. In his later years, he designated Hela, a grandson of Aguda, as his successor. He died in Mingde Palace in 1135 and was buried in the He Mausoleum (和陵). His descendants were massacred by Digunai (Prince of Hailing), the fourth ruler of the Jin dynasty, as a political move to eliminate possible contenders to the throne. His remains were relocated to Dafangshan (大房山), which became known as the Gong Mausoleum (恭陵).

== Family ==
Parents

- Empress Qinren of the Tangkuo clan (欽仁皇后 唐括氏)
  - Wanyan Zongpan, Prince of Song (宋王 完顏宗磐), 1st son
- Unknown:
  - Wanyan Zonggu, Prince of Bin (豳王 完顏宗固)
  - Wanyan Zongya, Prince of Dai (代王 完顏宗雅)
  - Wanyan Zongshun, Prince of Xu (徐王 完顏宗順)
  - Wanyan Zongwei, Prince of Yu (虞王 完顏宗偉), the Prince of Yu (虞王)
  - Wanyan Zongying, Prince of Teng (滕王 完顏宗英)
  - Wanyan Zongyi, Prince of Xue (薛王 完顏宗懿)
  - Wanyan Zongben the Prince of Yuan (原王 完顏宗本)
  - Gulan (鶻懶), the Prince of Yi (翼王)
  - Hulijia (胡里甲), sinicised name Wanyan Zongmei (完顏宗美), the Prince of Feng (豐王)
  - Shentumen (神土門), the Prince of Yun (鄆王)
  - Huboshu (斛孛束), the Prince of Huo (霍王)
  - Wolie (斡烈), the Prince of Cai (蔡王)
  - Wanyan Zongzhe of Bi (畢王 完顏宗哲),

Emperor Taizong of Jin House of Wanyan (1115–1234) Born: 1075 Died: 1135
Regnal titles
Preceded by Emperor Taizu of Jin	Emperor of Jin dynasty 1123–1135	Succeeded by Emperor Xizong of Jin
Preceded by Emperor Tianzuo of Liao	Emperor of China; 1125–1135	Succeeded by Emperor Xizong of Jin
