= Jingkang incident =

Part of the Jin–Song wars (1127)

Jingkang Incident
- Part of the Jin–Song wars
Date	January 1127
Location	Bianjing (present-day Kaifeng, Henan, China)
Result	Jin victory
Territorial changes	The Northern Song capital and territories north of the Huai River fell to the Jin

Belligerents
Northern Song dynasty	Jin dynasty

Commanders and leaders
Emperor Qinzong of Song	Emperor Taizong of Jin; Wanyan Zonghan; Wanyan Zongwang

Strength
First siege: 200,000; Second siege: 70,000	First siege: 100,000; Second siege: 150,000

The Jingkang Incident (Chinese: 靖康事变; pinyin: Jìngkāng Shìbiàn), also known as the Humiliation of Jingkang (靖康之耻; Jìngkāng Zhīchǐ) and the Disorders of the Jingkang Era (靖康之乱; Jìngkāng Zhīluàn), was an episode of invasions and atrocities that took place in 1127 during the Jin–Song wars when the troops of the Jurchen-led Jin dynasty besieged and sacked Bianjing (present-day Kaifeng, Henan), the capital of the Han-led Northern Song dynasty. The Jin forces captured the Song ruler, Emperor Qinzong, along with his father, the retired Emperor Huizong, assorted members of the imperial family from Emperor Taizong's bloodline, aristocrats, and numerous officials of the Song imperial court. The lives of ordinary civilians living in Bianjing's non-imperial quarters were generally spared, but they were forced to hand over enormous amounts of valuables and violence was not uncommon.

This event marked the collapse of the Northern Song dynasty that originally controlled most of China proper. Some members of the Song imperial family, most notably Zhao Gou (later Emperor Gaozong), managed to escape to southern China, where they reestablished the Song dynasty (known in historiography as the Southern Song dynasty), with the new capital in Lin'an (present-day Hangzhou, Zhejiang). The event also greatly contributed to the return of the descendants of Emperor Taizu to the line of succession, as most of Emperor Taizong's descendants were abducted and Emperor Gaozong failed to produce an heir.

Because it took place during the Jingkang era of Emperor Qinzong's reign, it became known as the "Jingkang Incident".

== Background ==
In 1120, under the Alliance Conducted at Sea, the Jin and Song dynasties agreed to form a military alliance against the Liao dynasty and, if victorious, divide up the Liao territories. The Jin would get a large portion of the northern region and the Song would get a smaller portion in the southern area known as the Sixteen Prefectures.

Led by Tong Guan, the Song army marched to the Song–Liao border and was stopped by the defensive forest that the Song had maintained since the reign of Emperor Taizu. In order to pass through, Tong Guan ordered the soldiers to clear the forest and continued the expedition into the Liao.

The Jin army sacked the Liao capital of Shangjing (present-day Bairin Left Banner, Inner Mongolia) and ended the Liao dynasty. The Song army in the south, however, could not even penetrate Liao's defensive positions and the army was defeated by the remaining Liao troops afterwards. This exposed the limitations of the Song army as well as the corruption and inefficiency in the Song imperial court. In the end, the Jin took control of all former Liao territories.

After the Liao dynasty's fall, the Song wanted the Sixteen Prefectures as promised. The Jin sold the land at a price of 300,000 bolts of silk and 200,000 ounces of silver. This price was considered extremely generous as it was the tribute the Song had already been paying to the Liao annually since the Chanyuan Treaty of 1005.

=== Prelude to the war ===
According to the Twenty-Four Histories, in 1123, three years after the fall of the Liao, a Jin general named Zhang Jue (张觉) defected to the Song. He was governor of the Jin-controlled Pingzhou Prefecture (present-day Zunhua, Hebei), which was within the Great Wall, but not counted among the Sixteen Prefectures. Nonetheless, the Song imperial court initially welcomed the defection and awarded Zhang Jue a title and property. The Jin, on the other hand, sent a small army aiming to overturn the defection but was defeated by Zhang Jue's troops.

In 1123 or 1124 (records differ), the Jin sent diplomats for Zhang Jue and sacked three Song cities. Panicking, Song general Wang Anzhong killed someone who looked similar to Zhang Jue and sent the head to the Jin, who realized it was a ruse and attacked the Song again. Zhang Jue was eventually executed in the winter of the same year. This came too late: in the fall of 1125, Emperor Taizong of Jin issued an order to launch a full-scale attack on Song territories.

== First Siege of Bianjing ==
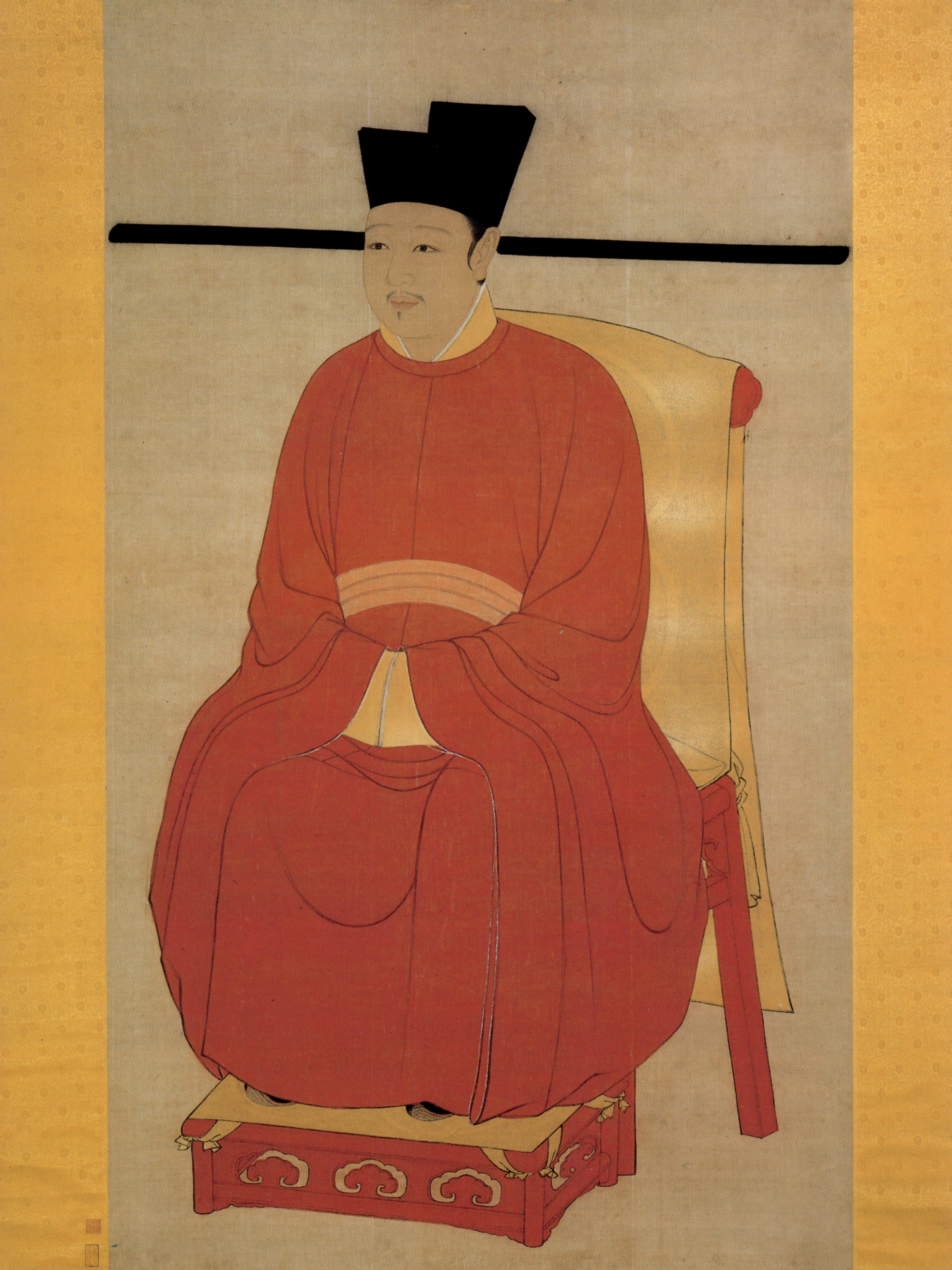
Emperor Huizong of Song

The Jin armies invaded Song territory from the west and from the north. When the Jin troops reached the former Song–Liao border, since the original defensive forest was cleared during the 1122 expedition, the Jin troops marched through a defenseless border without impediment. The Jin northern army advanced quickly, sacking Qinhuangdao in October 1125, followed by Baoding, Dingzhou, Zhengding and Xingtai in January 1126. This army, commanded by Wanyan Zongwang, did not meet much resistance as most Song generals surrendered their cities as soon as the Jin army arrived. On the other hand, the Jin western army, commanded by Wanyan Zonghan, was held up near the cities of Datong and Taiyuan from the very beginning and did not make much progress for the rest of the campaign. In February 1126, the Jin northern army crossed the Yellow River and began laying siege to the Song capital, Bianjing (present-day Kaifeng, Henan). Before the city was surrounded, Emperor Huizong had abdicated in favor of his eldest son, Emperor Qinzong, and fled with his entourage. The Jin northern army faced difficult siege warfare that was unsuitable for cavalry. At the same time, the Jin western army was still held up in the Datong area and could not come to the aid of the northern army. In an effort to end the battle sooner, Emperor Qinzong sent his ninth brother, Zhao Gou (later Emperor Gaozong), to the enemy camp for peace talks. The Jin emperor, Emperor Taizong, ordered Zhao Gou taken hostage until the Song produced a ransom. The Song imperial court eventually came forth with the ransom, and the city of Taiyuan was also given to the Jin as a gesture of good faith. Zhao Gou was released and the Jin northern army withdrew.

== Second Siege of Bianjing ==
Everything continued as usual once the Jin forces retreated. Lavish daily parties resumed at the imperial palace and Emperor Huizong returned to Bianjing.

Song generals suggested that large numbers of troops ought to be garrisoned along the Yellow River, but Emperor Qinzong rejected the proposal by arguing that the Jin forces would perhaps never return. Many experienced generals who defended the city in the first siege of Bianjing were removed from the capital and posted elsewhere in the country. Numerous army divisions were decommissioned or sent back to their prefectures of origin.

Three months after the first siege, the Jin imperial court sent two envoys to the Song. The two envoys were nobles from the former Liao dynasty. Emperor Qinzong misjudged the situation and believed they could be turned against the Jin ruler. Emperor Qinzong sent a coded letter sealed in candle wax, inviting them to join the Song to form an anti-Jin alliance. The two handed the letter to Emperor Taizong right away. Furious, Emperor Taizong ordered a larger army to attack the Song.

Since most of the Jin troops had just returned from their first expedition and had not even demobilized, the army was quickly ready for battle. Following precedents set in the previous campaign, the Jin army divided in two, Wanyan Zongwang's northern army and Wanyan Zonghan's western army.

The Jin armies took the same routes as in the previous campaign, and in September 1126, they set foot on Song territory again. This time, however, the western army was able to sack Datong within one month. Cities such as Luoyang and Zhengzhou surrendered, clearing the way to Bianjing. The northern army, having sacked Baoding, Dingzhou and Zhengding in September, regrouped and crossed the Yellow River in November. It then went on a rampage and sacked Qingfeng, Puyang and other satellite cities around Bianjing in December. By the middle of December, the two forces met at Bianjing (present-day Kaifeng, Henan) and the capital was besieged.

Unlike the first siege, Bianjing's defenses in the second siege had some fatal flaws:

1. Due to a lack of experienced generals and personnel, the defense process was unorganized;
2. The Jin army was much bigger than the first time. Emperor Taizong sent a 150,000 strong force, having learnt from the first siege, when the western army was held up at Datong and could not advance on Bianjing. This time, Datong was quickly captured and the full strength of the western army was also under the city walls;
3. Although Emperor Qinzong called for help and many responded, the rapid deployment of the Jin army made it impossible to aid the city. Song troops from all over the country, including Zhao Gou's troops, came to Bianjing but were not able to enter the city;
4. Emperor Qinzong put his trust in an official who claimed he could summon divine soldiers to the battlefield, causing much wasted time and loss of human lives.

On 9 January 1127, Bianjing fell to the Jin forces. Emperor Qinzong and his father, Emperor Huizong, were captured. Thus, the Northern Song dynasty came to an end.

In exchange for the Jin soldiers sparing the lives of Bianjing's civilian population, the people gave them wine, meat, silk, gold and silver. Song officials also turned over wine, weapons, horses, gold and silver after the Jin demanded them, as well as Buddhist and Taoist books, printing blocks, silk bolts, silk thread, pharmacy pills, parasols, ox carts, old bronze vessels, diagrams, maps, headgear worn by imperial consorts, musical instruments, bells, lanterns, Buddhist monks, teachers, physicians, storytellers, painters, clerks, jade carvers, wine makers, gardeners, masons, weapons makers, astronomers and musicians.

=== Abduction ===
On 20 March 1127, the Jin summoned the two captured emperors to their camp. Awaiting them was a directive from Emperor Taizong according to which they were to be stripped of their ceremonial trappings and demoted to commoners, and the Jin troops would compound the imperial palace.

As stated by The Accounts of Jingkang, the Jin troops plundered the imperial library and the imperial palace. They abducted hundreds of female servants and imperial musicians. Members of the imperial family were also abducted, and their residences were looted and often set ablaze. To avoid captivity and slavery under the Jin, many palace women committed suicide; others were killed for resisting rape.

Emperor Taizong feared that the remaining Song troops would launch a counter-offensive to reclaim the capital. Therefore, he set up in Bianjing a puppet government for the lands south of the Yellow River, and ordered all the assets and prisoners to be taken to Jin territory. Over 14,000 people, including much of the Song imperial family, marched north. Their entourage suffered from illness, dehydration and exhaustion, and many never made it. Upon arrival, each person went through a ritual where the person had to be naked and wearing only sheep skins. Contrary to what was previously thought, the ceremony was drawn from ancient Han Chinese customs and put together by Jin experts on the Han civilization, rather than a Jurchen ritual. Empress Zhu committed suicide due to being unable to bear the humiliation.

Men were exchanged for horses with a ratio of ten men for one horse.

All the female prisoners were ordered, on pain of death, to serve their Jin masters no matter what position in society they had previously held. Some of them, especially princesses, were turned into slaves in a part of the Jin palace called the Huanyi Garden (浣衣院; lit. ''laundry garden''), while others were sold. A Song prince's granddaughter was bought for less than ten ounces of gold. In addition, many of the female prisoners became concubines of Jin princes. For example, Wanyan Zongwang took Zhao Fujin, Emperor Huizong's daughter, while on their way back to the Jin. Later on, Emperor Taizong bestowed more Song noblewomen upon him.

Liao princesses from the Yelü imperial clan and the Xiao clan (the Liao dynasty's consort kin) had also been distributed to Jin princes as concubines after their dynasty's fall.

Before the Jurchen Jin overthrew the Khitan Liao, unmarried Jurchen girls were offered to Liao envoys as a custom, with the girls and their families having to host the Liao envoys, which caused resentment among the Jurchens. Song envoys to Jin were usually entertained by singing girls. In retaliation, Liao female prisoners were given to the Song princes after their original wives were confiscated. One of Emperor Huizong's sons was given a consort from the Liao palace and another son was given a Liao princess. The members of the Song imperial family were initially considered fortunate because their Liao counterparts had received worse treatment; the Jurchens had not only sacked and destroyed the Liao capitals, but also burned the ancestral tombs of the Liao emperors, and the children of Emperor Tianzuo of Liao had beem distributed as gifts to the Jin soldiers, whereas the Song emperor was at first allowed to keep his children.

Emperor Qinzong would spend the rest of his life in captivity, although his status was eventually raised to nobility and he began to receive a stipend. In 1156, as a humiliation for both men, the former Emperor Qinzong of Song and the former Emperor Tianzuo of Liao were forced by the Jin emperor to play a match of polo against each other. Emperor Qinzong was weak and frail, and so fell off his horse, while Emperor Tianzuo, despite being quite old himself, was more familiar with horseback riding and tried to escape on his horse, but was shot and killed by archers.

== Aftermath and appraisal ==
- The scale of destruction and devastation was unprecedented: treasures, art collections and scrolls from the imperial library were lost on a scale that the Chinese had never seen before. Due to the heavy damage to the country's economy and military, and the loss of talented manpower, the Southern Song dynasty did not recover the lost territories despite constant fighting between the Song and the Jin. It would take another 200 years, until the Ming dynasty, to reclaim all the territories that the Song dynasty lost.
- Many foreign-sounding, non-traditional Chinese surnames existing in China today can date back to this event, as the Han Chinese captives were forced to adopt Jurchen surnames. In fact, many noble clans during the Qing dynasty, including the imperial family, had the surname "Gioro" (e.g. Aisin Gioro, Irgen Gioro); it is believed that they were the descendants of Emperor Huizong and Emperor Qinzong.
- This conquest, combined with the later Mongol rule, has been speculated to have caused China's advance into capitalism to fall behind by several centuries; although the Ming dynasty later restored some of the old order, certain policies and their own fall to the Manchus stagnated China once more. This is supported by the fact that the Song economy had been advanced, and exhibited many features of capitalism. According to this view, the Jingkang Incident holds historic significance in regard to late imperial China's decline.
- Researchers who published their findings in the People's Political Consultative Daily in 2001, pointed out that this event led to the transformation of women's rights in China. Since the female members of the imperial family who were captured were sold as slaves or taken as concubines, the subsequent Chinese rulers greatly emphasized the importance of sexual norms, especially a woman's chastity and loyalty toward her husband. Women of later dynasties were instructed that when confronted with the choice of survival or the honor of chastity, survival was not an option.

== In popular culture ==
- This event was referred to as the "Lingering Humiliation of Jingkang" in Man Jiang Hong, a lyrical poem commonly attributed to Song general Yue Fei, but was actually written by an anonymous poet during the Ming dynasty.
- In The Legend of the Condor Heroes, a wuxia novel by Louis Cha, this national humiliation inspired Quanzhen Taoist Qiu Chuji to name the two main characters, Guo Jing and Yang Kang, who were born soon afterwards in the storyline.
- In Bandit Kings of Ancient China, a video game by Koei, failure to win the game before 1127 results in the Jurchens occupying the whole of China in January 1127, ending the game.
- Guy Gavriel Kay liberally fictionalized the incident in River of Stars, a historical fantasy novel. Kay uses alternate names for historic places and characters.

== See also ==
- Timeline of the Jin–Song wars
- Zhou Tong
- Han Shizhong
- Li Qingzhao
