= Family tree of Chinese monarchs (453–1279) =

This is a family tree of Chinese monarchs from the Northern and Southern dynasties period to the collapse of the Southern Song dynasty.

Family trees of Chinese monarchs
- (ancient)
- (Spring and Autumn period)
- (Warring States period)
- (early)
- (middle)
- (late)

== Southern and Northern Dynasties ==
=== Liu Song ===
Liu Song

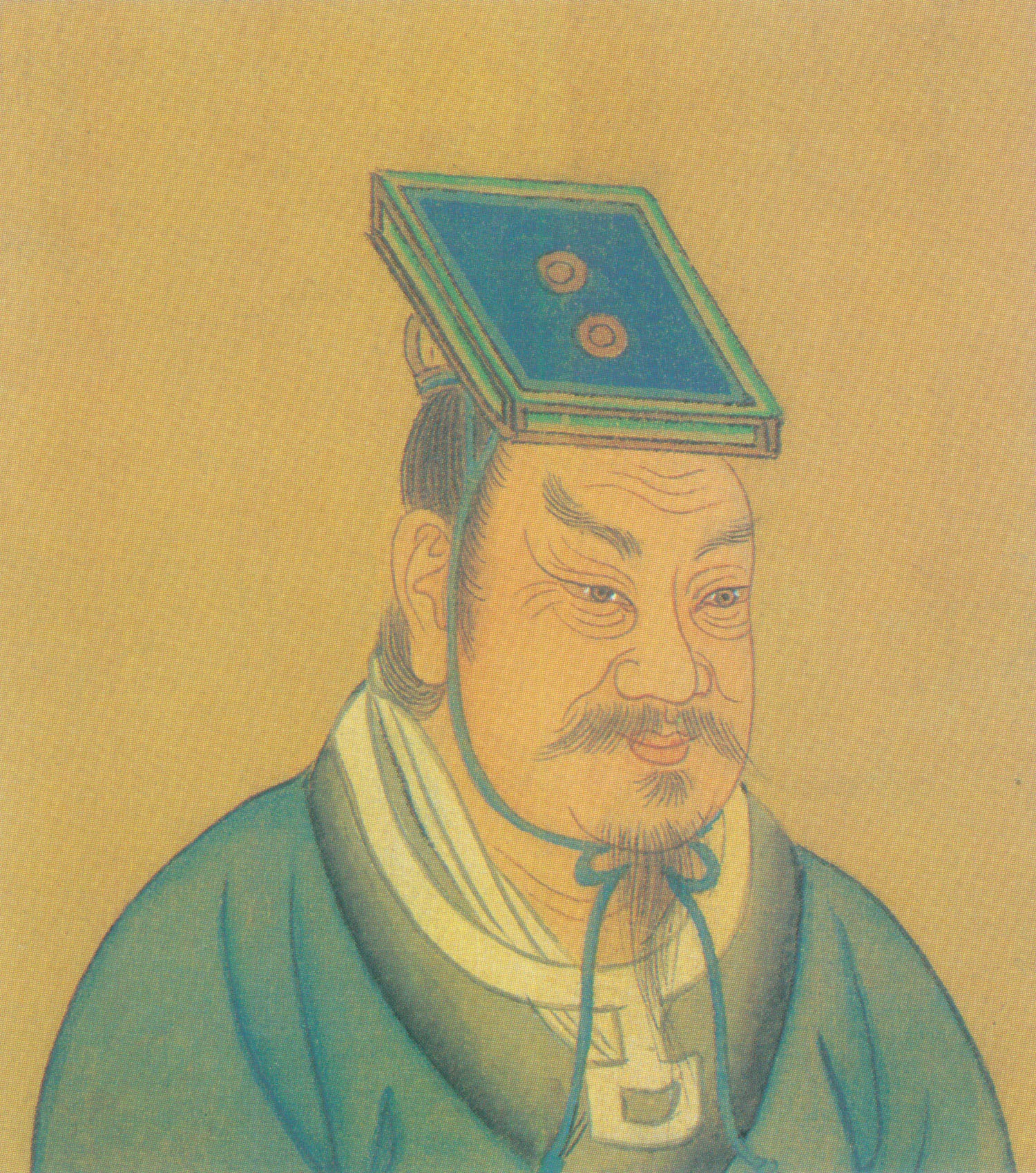
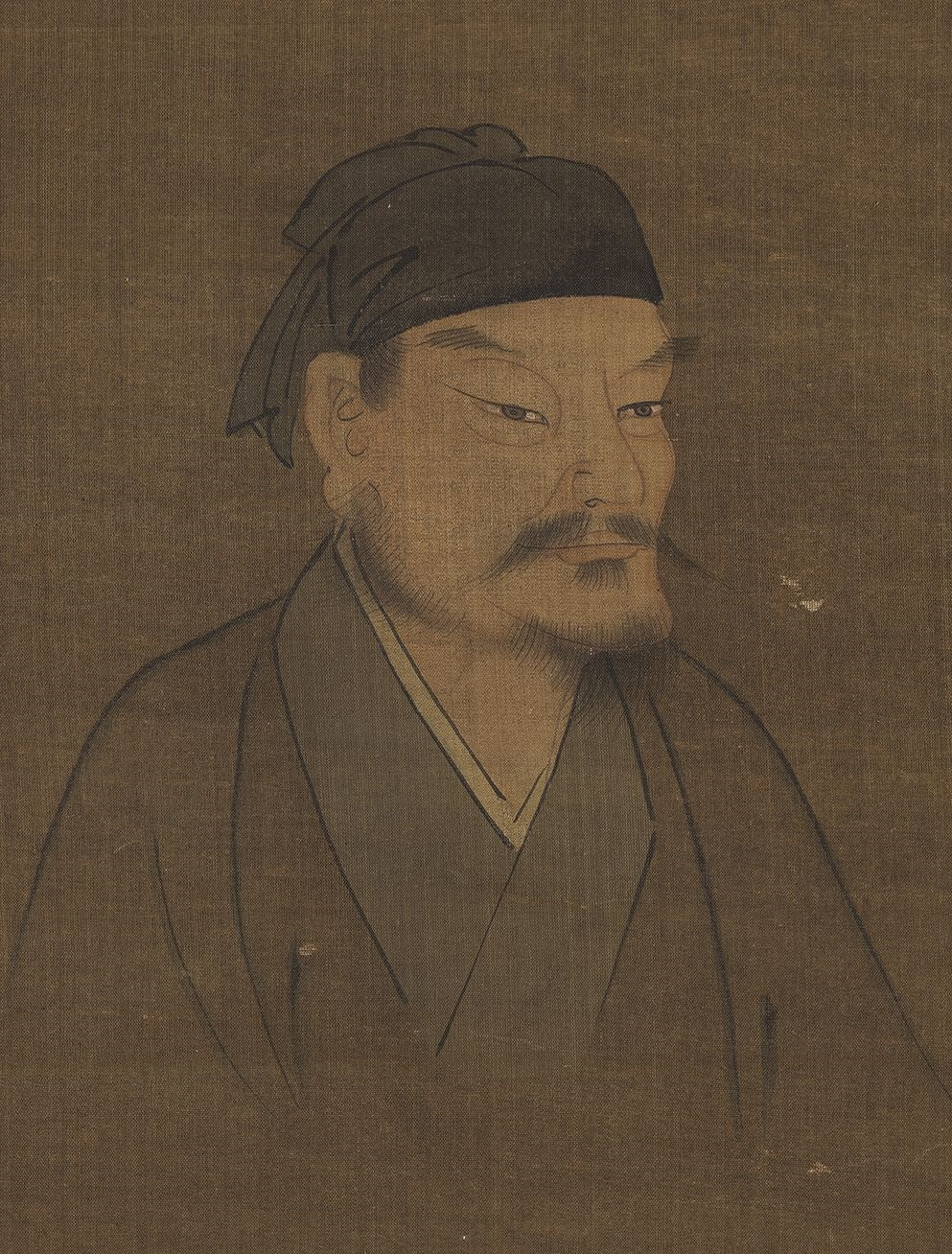
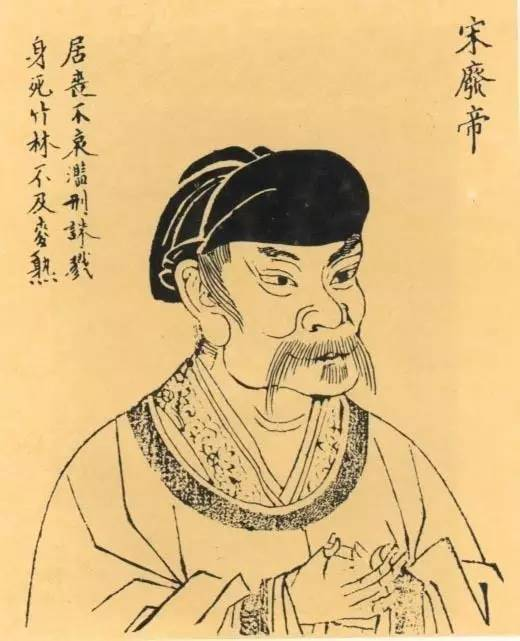
Liu Yu 刘裕 (363–422) Wudi (r. 420–422)^{1}
Liu Yifu 刘义符 (406–424); Shao (r. 423–424)^{2}	Liu Yilong 刘义隆 (407–453) Wen (r. 424–453)^{3}	Liu Yikang 劉義康 (409–451)
Liu Shao 刘劭; 426–453; r. 453^{4}	Liu Jun (430–464); Xiaowu (r. 453–464)^{5}	Liu Jun 劉濬 (429–453); Prince Shixing	Liu Yu 刘彧 (439–472); Ming (r. 465–472)^{7}	Liu Xiufan 刘休范 (448–474)
Liu Ziye 刘子业 (449–466) Qianfei (r. 464–466)^{6}	Liu Zixun (劉子勛) (456–466; r. 466)	Liu Yu (劉昱) (463–477); Houfei (r. 472–477)^{8}	Liu Zhun (劉準) (469–479); Shun (r. 477–479)^{9}

=== Southern Qi ===
Southern Qi

Xiao Chengzhi 蕭承之; 384–447
Xiao Daosheng 蕭道生	Xiao Daocheng 蕭道成; 427–482; Gao r. 479–482
Xiao Luan 蕭鸞; 452–498; Ming r. 494–498	Xiao Ni 蕭嶷; 444–492; Wenxian of Yuzhang	Xiao Ze 蕭賾; 440–493; Wu r. 482–493
Xiao Baojuan 蕭寶卷; 483–501; r. 498–501	Xiao Baoyin 蕭寶寅; 487–530; r. 527	Xiao Baorong 蕭寶融; 488–502; He r. 501–502	Xiao Zhangmao 蕭長懋; 458–493; Wen 文皇帝
Xiao Zhaoye 蕭昭業; 473–494; r. 493–494	Xiao Zhaowen 蕭昭文; 480–494; r. 494

=== Liang dynasty and Western Liang ===
Liang dynasty and Western Liang

- Liang emperors

- Western Liang emperors

- Liang throne pretenders

Xiao Shunzhi 萧顺之
Xiao Yi 萧懿 (d. 500)	Xiao Yan 蕭衍; Wu (464–502-549)	Xiao Xiu 蕭秀; 475-518	Xiao Hong 蕭宏; 473-526
Xiao Yuanming 蕭淵明 d.556; r.555	Xiao Tong 萧统 (501-531)	Xiao Gang 蕭綱; Jianwen; 503-549-551	Xiao Yi 蕭繹; Yuan; 508–552-554-555	Xiao Ji 蕭紀; 508–552-553	Xiao Zhengde 蕭正德 d.549; r.548-549
Xiao Huan 萧欢	Xiao Cha 蕭詧; Xuan; 519-555-562	Xiao Daqi 蕭大器; 524–551	Xiao Fangdeng 蕭方等 (528-549)	Xiao Fangzhi 蕭方智; Jing; 543-555-557
Xiao Dong 萧栋 d.552; r.551	Xiao Kui 蕭巋; Ming; 542–562-585	Xiao Yan 蕭巖	Xiao Zhuang 蕭莊; 548-557-560-577?
Empress Xiao 蕭皇后 566?–648	Xiao Yu 蕭瑀; 574–647	Xiao Cong 蕭琮; Jing r.585-587	Xiao Xuan 萧璿
Xiao Xian 萧铣; 583-621; r.617–621

=== Chen dynasty ===
Chen dynasty emperors family tree

Chen Wenzan 陳文贊
Chen Daotan 陳道譚	Chen Baxian 陳霸先 (503–559); Wu (r. 557–559)
Chen Qian 陳蒨 (522–566); Wen (r. 559–566)	Chen Xu 陳頊 (530–582); Xuan (r. 569–582)	Chen Chang 陳昌 (537–560)
Chen Bozong 陳伯宗 (554?–570); Fei (r. 566–568)	Chen Shubao 陳叔寶; 553–604; r. 582–589	Chen Shuda 陳叔達 d.635	Ningyuan 寧遠公主 577–605	Emperor Wen of Sui
Chen Yin 陳胤 b.573	Chen Yuan 陳淵 b.575

=== Northern Wei, Eastern Wei, Western Wei ===
Tuoba / Yuan clan, Wei emperors family tree

Legend:

- – Northern Wei emperors
- – Western Wei emperors
- – Eastern Wei emperors
- – Northern Wei throne pretenders

See Tuoba clan Dai state family tree
Tuoba Gui; Daowu; 371–386–409
Tuoba Xi; 399–421	Tuoba Si; Mingyuan; 392–409–423
Tuoba Ta; 416–488	Tuoba Tao; Taiwu; 408–423–452
Yuan Zhongkui	Tuoba Huang; 428–451	Tuoba Yu; 452
Yuan Faseng; 453–536	Tuoba Jun; Wencheng; 440–452–465	Tuoba Zhen; 447–496
Tuoba Hong; Xianwen; 454–465– 471–476	Yuan Yi	Yuan Bin; 464–499
Tuoba Hong; Xiaowen; 467–471–499	Yuan Yu; 470–501	Yuan Yong d. 528	Yuan Xiang; 476–504	Yuan Xie d. 508	Yuan Ye; 530–531; d. 532	Yuan Rong; 481–526
Yuan Ke; Xuanwu; 483–499–515	Yuan Xun; 483–497	Yuan Yu; 488–508	Yuan Yi; 487–520	Yuan Huai; 488–517	Yuan Yue; 494–532	Yuan Xin	Yuan Gong; Jiemin; 498–531–532	Yuan Yu d. 555	Yuan Hao d. 529	Yuan Shao d. 528	Yuan Ziyou; Xiaozhuang; 507–528–531	Yuan Lang; 513–531–532
Yuan Xu; Xiaoming; 510–515–528	Yuan Baohui	Yuan Baoju; Wen; 507–535–551	Yuan Dan d. 537	Yuan Ti; 506–528	Yuan Xiu; Xiaowu; 510–532–535	Yuan; Huangtou
daughter b./r. 528	Yuan Zhao; 526–528	Yuan Qin; Fei; 551–554	Yuan Kuo; Gong; 537–554– 556–557	Yuan Shanjian; Xiaojing; 524–534– 550–552	Yuan Zan

=== Northern Qi ===
Northern Qi emperors

Gao Huan 高欢 (496–547)
Gao Cheng 高澄 (521–549)	Gao Yang 高洋 (526–559); Wenxuan (r. 550–559)	Empress Gao 高皇后	Gao Yan 高演 (535–561); Xiaozhao (r. 560–561)	Gao Zhan 高湛 (537–569); Wucheng (r. 561–565)	Gao Jie 高湝(?–577)
Gao Changgong 高长恭 d. 573; Prince of Lanling 蘭陵王	Gao Yanzong 高延宗 (?–578; r. 576)	Gao Yin 高殷 (545–561); Fei (r. 559–560)	Gao Shaoyi 高紹義 (b. 546; r. 578–580)	Gao Bainian 高百年 556–564	Gao Wei 高緯 (557–577); Houzhu (r. 565–577)	Gao Yan 高儼 (558–571)
Gao Heng 高恆 (570–577); Youzhu (r. 577)

=== Northern Zhou ===
Northern Zhou emperors family tree

Yuwen Gong 宇文肱 (d.526)	Yuan Huai 元懷 （488–517）
Yuwen Hao 宇文顥 (d. 524)	Princess; Fengyi (d. 541)	Yuwen Tai 宇文泰 (507–556)	Emp. Xiaowu of Northern Wei r. 532–535	Dugu Xin 獨孤信; 504–557
Yuwen Hu 宇文護 (513–572)	Yuwen Jue 宇文覺 (542–557); Xiaomin (r. 557)^{1}	Yuwen Xian 宇文憲 545–578	Yuwen Yong 宇文邕 (543–578); Wu (r. 560–578)^{3}	Yuwen Yu 宇文毓 (534–560); Ming (r. 557–560)^{2}	Empress; Dugu 獨孤王后 d.558	Dugu Qieluo 獨孤伽羅; 544–602	Emperor; Wen of Sui r. 581–604	Duchess; Dugu
Yuwen Yun 宇文贇 (559–580); Xuan (r. 578–579)^{4}	Yang Lihua 楊麗華; 561–609	Sui dynasty	Emperor; Gaozu of Tang r. 618–626
Yuwen Yan 宇文衍 (573–581); Jing (r. 579–581)^{5}	Tang dynasty

== Sui dynasty ==
The following is a simplified family tree for the Sui dynasty, which ruled China between AD 581 and 618. The dynasty was named for the family title: the Yang (楊) family were the Dukes of Sui.

Those who became emperor are listed in bold, with their years of reign large. The names given for emperors are posthumous names, the form by which Sui emperors were most commonly known.

Sui dynasty

Dugu Xin 獨孤信
SUI DYNASTY
Yang Jian 楊坚 541–604; **Wendi 文帝**; 581–604	Dugu Qieluo 獨孤伽羅 544–602; Empress Xian 獻皇后	Duchess Dugu	Li Bing 李昺 d. 572; Duke of Tang 唐國公
1	2	3	4	5	TANG DYNASTY
Yang Yong 楊勇 d. 604; Prince of Fangling 房陵王	Yang Guang 楊廣 569–618; **Yangdi 煬帝**; 604–617	Yang Jun 楊俊; 571–600; Prince of Qin 秦孝王	Yang Xiu 楊秀; 573–618	Yang Liang 楊諒; 575–605	Li Yuan 李淵 566–635; **Gaozu 高祖**; 618–626
1	2	3
Yang Zhao 楊昭; 584–606; Cr.Prince Yuande 元德太子	Yang Jian 楊暕; 585–618; Prince of Qi 齊王	Yang Gao 楊杲 607–618; Prince of Zhao 趙王	**Yang Hao** 楊浩 d. 618; Prince of Qin 秦王; 618?
1	2	3
Yang Tan 楊倓; 603–618; Prince of Yan 燕王	Yang Tong 楊侗 605–619; **Gongdi 恭帝**; 618–619	Yang You 楊侑 605–619; **Gongdi 恭帝**; 617–618

== Tang and Wu Zhou dynasties ==
The following is a simplified family tree for the Tang dynasty, which ruled China between AD 618 and 907. The Tang dynasty was interrupted by the reign of Empress Wu Zetian (AD 690–705), who after deposing her sons, declared herself the founder of a Wu Zhou dynasty (武周); the Tang dynasty was resumed by her sons following her abdication. The dynasty was named for the family title: the Li (李) family were the Dukes of Tang.

The names given in bold for emperors are temple names, the form by which Tang emperors were most commonly known (with the exception of Shangdi/Shaodi (殤帝 / 少帝), whose posthumous titles mean simply "died young" and "the young emperor", and Aidi (哀帝), also known as Zhaoxuan (昭宣), neither of whom were awarded temple names). The names of Xuánzōng I (玄宗) and Xuānzōng II (宣宗) are originally different in Mandarin Chinese, but are rendered the same in Pinyin English transliteration (once the tones have been removed).

Tang and Wu Zhou dynasties

The Tang emperors claimed descent from people such as Li Guang and Laozi

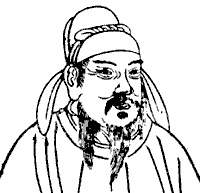
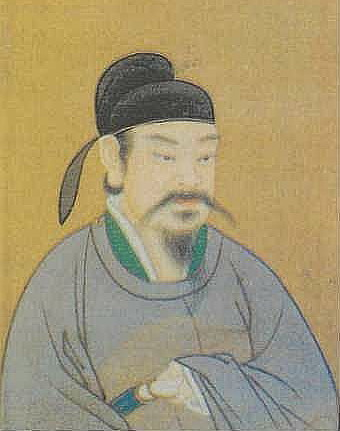
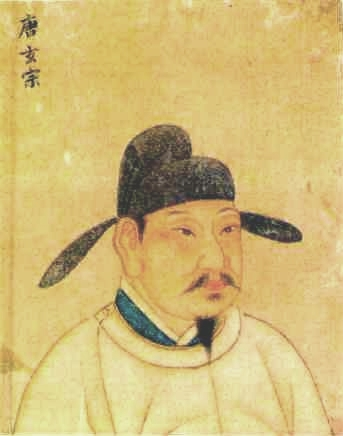
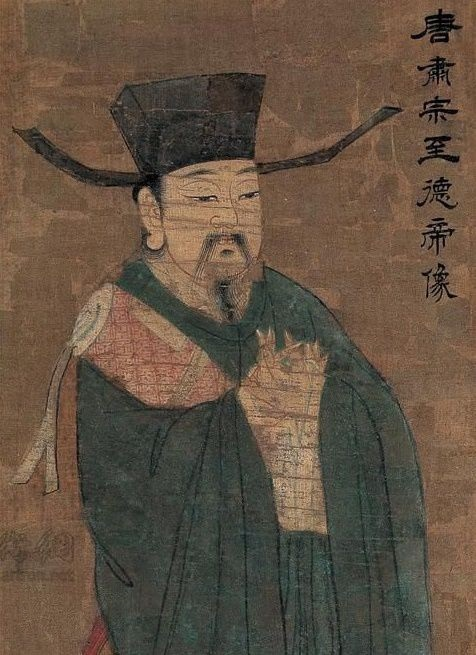
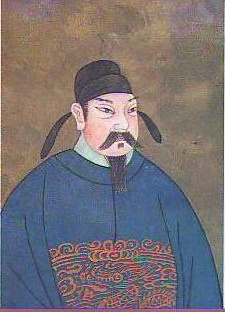
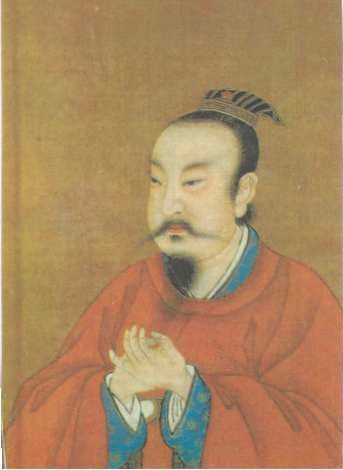
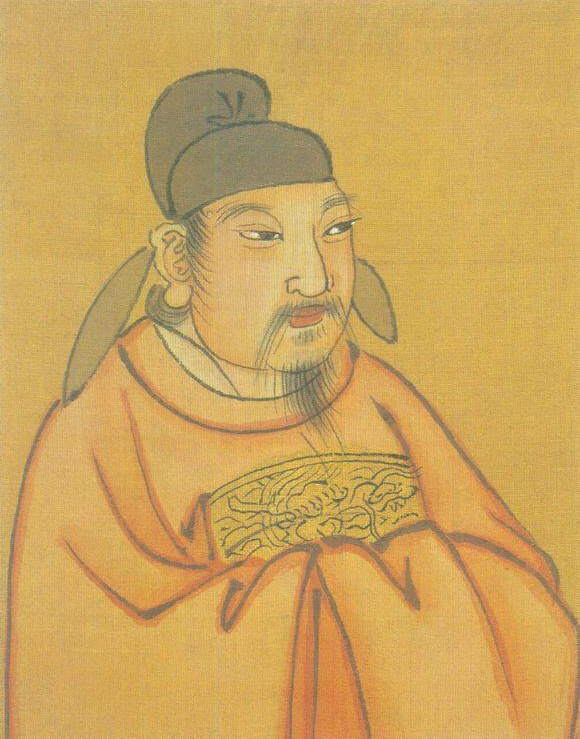
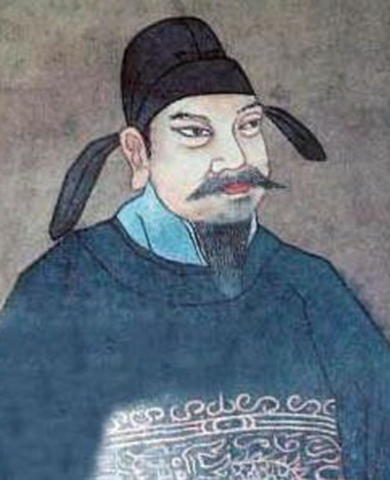
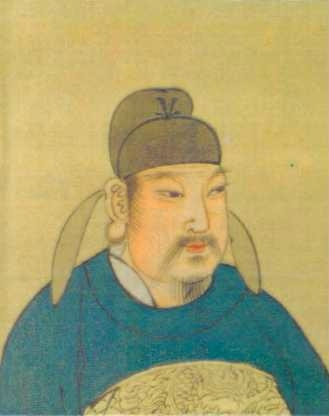
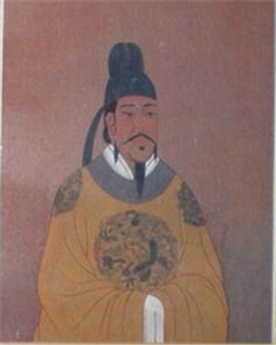
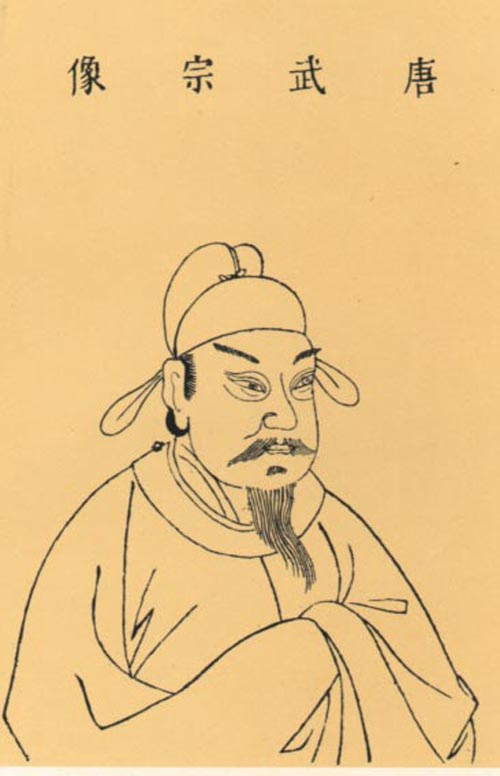
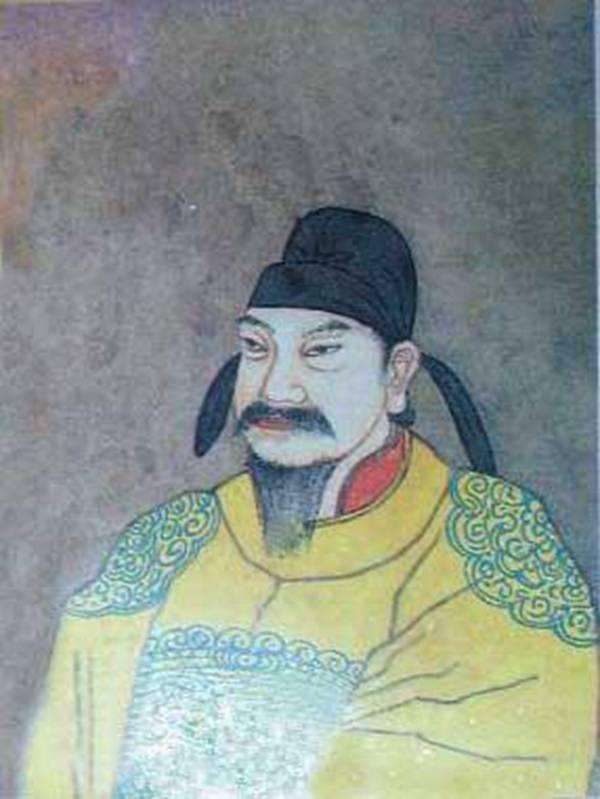
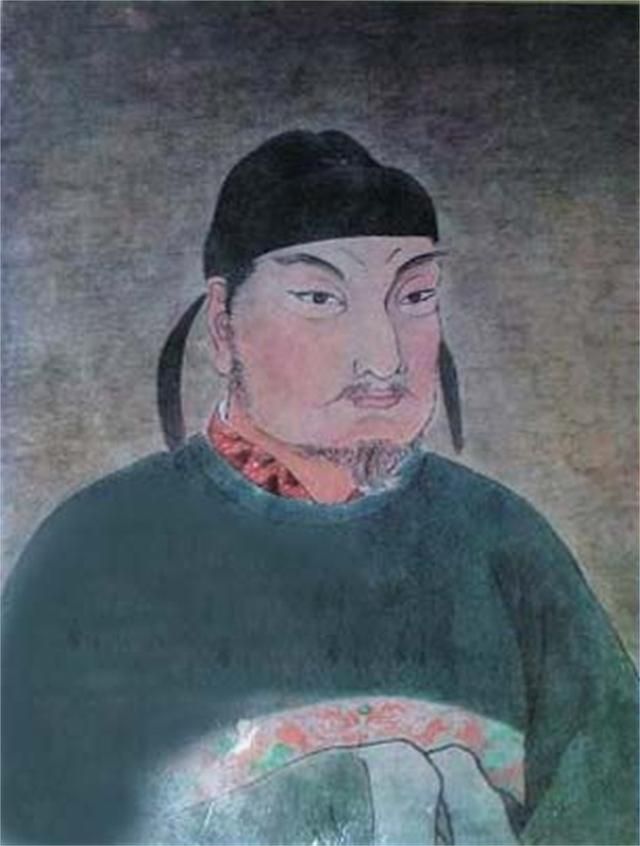
Li Yuan 李淵 566–635 **Gaozu 高祖**; 618–626**^{1}**
1	2	4
Li Jiancheng 李建成 589–626; Cr. Prince Yin 隱太子	Li Shimin 李世民 598–649 **Taizong 太宗**; 626–649**^{2}**	Li Yuanji 李元吉; 603–626; Prince of Qi 齊王	Wu Shiyue 武士彠; 559–635; King Zhongxiao 忠孝王
1	3	4	8	9	WU ZHOU DYNASTY
Li Chengqian 李承乾 619–645; Prince Min of Hengshan 恆山愍王	Li Ke 李恪 d. 653; Prince of Yulin 鬱林王	Li Tai 李泰; 618–652; Prince Gong of Pu 濮恭王	Li Zhen 李貞 d. 688; Prince Jing of Yue 越敬王	Li Zhi 李治 628–683; **Gaozong 高宗**; 649–683**^{3}**	Wu Zhao 武曌 624–705; **Wu Zetian 武則天**; 690–705^{1(6)}
1	4	5 (1)	6 (2)	7 (3)	8 (4)	(6)
Li Zhong 李忠; 643–665; Prince of Yan 燕王	Li Sujie 李素節; 646–690; Prince of Xu 許王	Li Hong 李弘; 652–675; Xiaojing 孝敬	Li Xian 李賢 653–684; Cr. Prince Zhanghuai 章懷太子	Li Xian 李顯 656–710 **Zhongzong 中宗**; 684, 705–710**^{4}**	Li Dan 李旦 662–716 **Ruizong 睿宗**; 684–690, 710–712**^{5}**	Princess Taiping 太平公主; 665(?)–713
2	1	2	3	4	1	3
Li Shouli 李守禮; 672–741; Cr. Prince Xima	Li Chongrun 李重潤 682–701; Cr. Prince Yide 懿德太子	Li Chongfu 李重福; 680–710; Prince Qiao 譙王	Li Chongjun 李重俊 d. 707; Cr. Prince Jiemin 節愍太子	Li Chongmao 李重茂; 695/698–714; **Shangdi 殤帝**; 710**^{7}**	Li Guo'er 李裹兒; 684(?)–710; Princess Anle 安樂公主	Li Chengqi 李成器; 679–742; Rangdi 讓帝	Li Longji 李隆基 685–762 **Xuanzong 玄宗**; 712–756**^{8}**
1	1	2	3	16
Li Chenghong 李承宏; Pr. of Guangwu 廣武王; Emperor in Chang'an; 763	Li Cong 李琮 d. 752; Fengtian 奉天	Li Ying 李瑛 d. 737; Crown Prince	Li Heng 李亨 711–762 **Suzong 肅宗**; 756–762**^{9}**	Li Lin 李璘 d. 757; Prince of Yong 永王
1	3	9
Li Yu 李豫 727–779 **Daizong 代宗**; 762–779**^{10}**	Li Tan 李倓 d. 757; Chengtian 承天	Li Guang 李僙 d. 791; Prince of Xiang
1	1
Li Gua 李適 742–805 **Dezong 德宗**; 779–805**^{11}**	Li Xuan 李宣; Prince of Yiwu 伊吾郡王
1
Li Song 李誦 761–806; **Shunzong 順宗**; 805**^{12}**	□
1
Li Chun 李純 778–820 **Xianzong 憲宗**; 805–820**^{13}**	Li Yun 李熅 d. 887; Prince of Xiang 襄王; Emperor in Chang'an; 886–887
1	3	6	13
Li Ning 李寧; 793–812; Cr. Prince Huizhao	Li Heng 李恆 795–824 **Muzong 穆宗**; 820–824**^{14}**	Li Wu 李悟 d. 826; Prince of Jiàng 絳王	Li Chen 李忱 810–859 **Xuānzong 宣宗**; 846–859**^{18}**
1	2	3	4	5	1	5
Li Zhan 李湛 809–827; **Jingzong 敬宗**; 824–827**^{15}**	Li Ang 李昂 809–840 **Wenzong 文宗**; 827–840**^{16}**	Li Cou 李湊 d. 835; Cr. Prince Huaiyi	Li Rong 李溶; 812–840; Prince of An 安王	Li Yan 李炎 814–846 **Wuzong 武宗**; 840–846**^{17}**	Li Cui 李漼 833–873 **Yizong 懿宗**; 859–873**^{19}**	Li Zi 李滋 d. 897; Prince of Tong 通王
1	1	5	7
Li Pu 李普 824–828; Cr. Prince Daohuai 悼懷太子	Li Chengmei 李成美 d. 840; Prince of Chen 陳王	Li Yong 李永 d. 838; Cr. Prince Zhuangke 莊恪太子	Li Xuan 李儇 862–888; **Xizong 僖宗**; 873–888**^{20}**	Li Yue 李曄 867–904 **Zhaozong 昭宗**; 888–904**^{21}**
1	9
Li Yu 李裕 d. 905; Prince of De 德王	Li Zhu 李柷 892–908; **Aidi 哀帝** or **Zhaoxuan 昭宣**; 904–907**^{22}**

== Five Dynasties and Ten Kingdoms period ==
The fifty years between the fall of the Tang dynasty and the establishment of the Song dynasty were a time of upheaval known as the Five Dynasties and Ten Kingdoms period. During this period, five short-lived imperial dynasties ruled the heart of China, while a series of small independent kingdoms were established in the south.

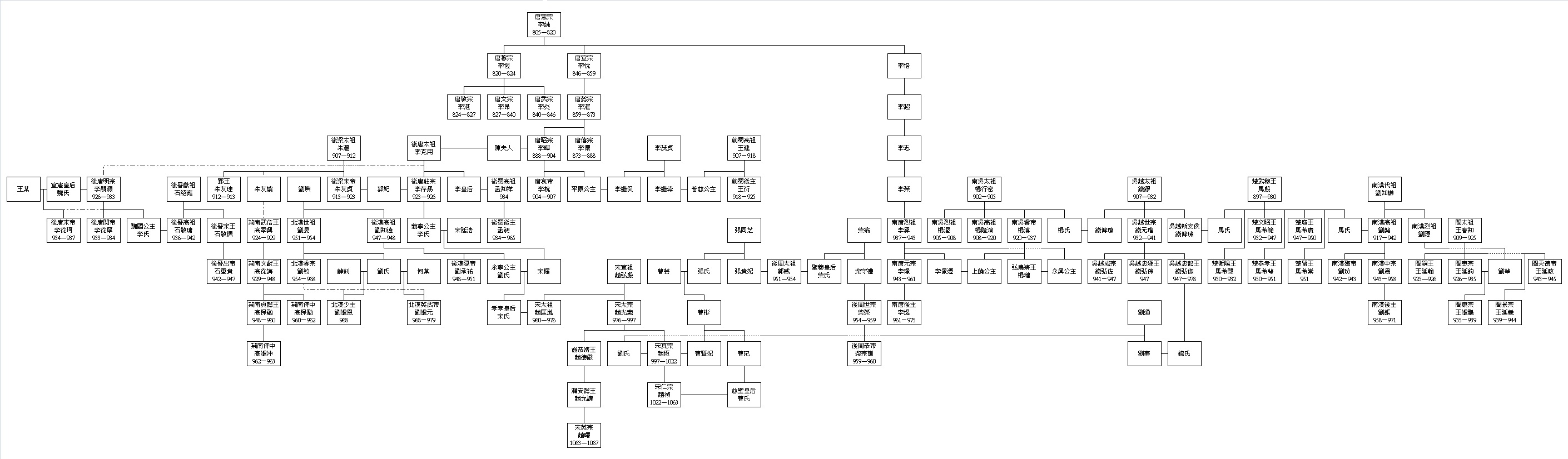

=== Later Liang ===
The Later Liang ruled between 907 and 923.

Later Liang

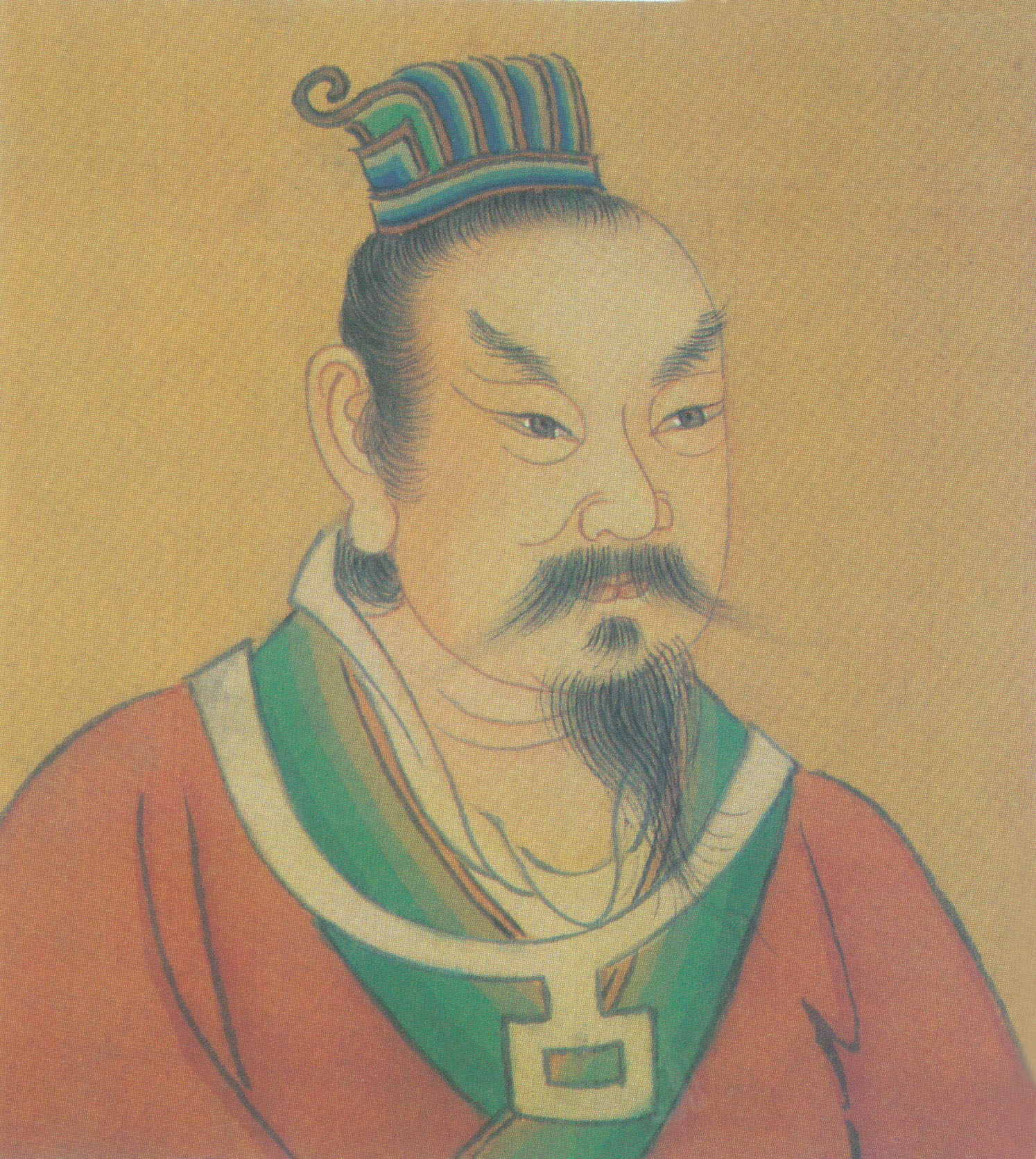
Zhu Wen 朱溫 852–912 Taizu 太祖; 907–912
3	8
Zhu Yougui 朱友圭 d. 913; 912–913	Zhu Zhen 朱瑱 888–923; Modi 末帝; 913–923

=== Later Tang ===
The Later Tang ruled between 923 and 937.

Later Tang rulers

Adopted
Marriage
Li Keyong 李克用 856–908	Li Ni 李霓
Li Cunxu 李存勖 885–926; Zhuangzong 莊宗; 923–926	Li Siyuan 李嗣源 867–933; Mingzong 明宗; 926–933
Li Congke 李從珂 885–937; Modi 末帝; 934–937	Li Congyi 李從益 931–947; Prince of Xu 許王	Li Congrong 李從榮d. 933; Prince of Qin 秦王	Li Conghou 李從厚 914–934; Mindi 愍帝; 933–934	Empress Li d. 950	Shi Jingtang 石敬瑭; Gaozu of Later Jin 高祖; 892–936–942
Li Chongmei 李重美 d. 937; Prince of Yong 雍王

=== Later Jin ===
The Later Jin ruled between 936 and 947.

Later Jin rulers family tree

adopted
Marriage
Li Siyuan 李嗣源; Mingzong 明宗 of (Later) Tang; 867–926–933	Shi Shaoyong 石紹雍
Empress Li d. 950	Shi Jingtang 石敬瑭 892–942; Gaozu 高祖 936–942	Shi Jingru 石敬儒
Shi Chonggui 石重貴 914–974; Chudi 出帝 942–947

=== Later Han and Northern Han ===
The Later Han ruled between 947 and 951. Liu Min, brother of Emperor Gaozu the founder of the Later Han, established the Northern Han kingdom, which ruled the area north of the Chinese heartland until it was overrun by Emperor Taizong of Song in 979.

The family tree of the Later Han and Northern Han rulers

– Later Han emperors; – Northern Han emperors

adopted
Marriage
Liu Tian 劉琠; Xianzu 显祖
Liu Zhiyuan 劉知遠 895–948; Gaozu 高祖; 947–948	Liu Min 劉旻 895–954; Shizu 世祖; 951–954
Liu Chengyou 劉承祐 931–951; Yindi 隱帝; 948–951	Liu Yun 劉贇 d.951; r.950	Liu Jun 劉钧 926–968; Ruizong 睿宗; 954–968	Xue Zhao 薛钊	Lady Liu 劉氏	Mr. He 何某
Liu Jien 劉继恩 d. 968; Shaozhu 少主; 968	Liu Jiyuan 劉继元 d. 992; Yingwudi 英武帝; 968–979

=== Later Zhou ===
The Later Zhou ruled between 951 and 960.

Later Zhou emperors family tree

Chai 柴翁
Chai Shouli 柴守礼 896–967	Empress Shengmu 圣穆皇后	Guo Wei 郭威 904–954; Taizu 太祖; 951–954
Chai Rong 柴榮 921–959; Shizong 世宗; 954–959
Chai Zongxun 柴宗训 953–973; Gongdi 恭帝; 959–960

=== Former Shu ===
Former Shu

Wang Jian 王建 847–918; Gaozu 高祖; 907–918
Wang Yan 王衍 899–925; Houzhu 後主; 918–925

=== Later Shu ===
The Later Shu kingdom gained independence from the Later Tang in 934, remaining an independent state until conquered by the Song dynasty in 965.

Later Shu

Li Keyong 李克用; 856–908
Lady Li d.932	Meng Zhixiang 孟知祥 874–934; Gaozu 高祖; 934	Empress; Dowager Li 李太后 d.965
Meng Chang 孟昶 919–965; Houzhu 后主; 934–965	Consort Xu 徐惠妃 c.940–976 Madame Huarui 花蕊夫人
Meng Xuanzhe 孟玄喆 937-991; Duke of Teng 滕國公

=== Wu and Southern Tang ===
The Wu kingdom existed as an independent state 907–937. In 937 Li Bian (also known as Xu Zhigao), at one point an adopted son of Yang Xingmi and later the adopted son of the paramount general Xu Wen, usurped power and established the Southern Tang kingdom, which remained an independent state until conquered by the Song dynasty in 975.

Southern Tang and Wu

– Wu emperors; – Southern Tang emperors

Yang Xingmi 杨行密 852–905; Taizu 太祖 902–905	Xu Wen 徐溫 862–927; Yizu 義祖
Yang Wo 杨渥 886–908; Liezu 烈祖 (905–)907–908	Yang Longyan; 897–920; Gaozu 高祖; 908–920	Yang Pu 杨溥 900–938; Ruidi 睿帝; 920–937	Li Bian 李昪 888–943; Liezu 烈祖; 937–943	Xú Zhīxùn (elder) 徐知訓 d. 918	Xú Zhīxùn 徐知詢 d. 934; Kang of Donghai 東海康王
Yang Lian 杨琏 d. 940; Jing of Hongnong 弘農靖王	Princess; Yongxing 永兴公主; 917–940	Princess; Shangrao 上饶公主 d. 937	Xu Jingqian 徐景遷 919–937; Ding of Chu 楚定王	Li Jing 李璟 916–961; Yuanzong 元宗; 943–961	Li Jingsui 李景遂 920–958; Cr. Prince Wencheng 文成太弟	Li Jingda 李景達 924–971; Cr. Prince Zhaoxiao 昭孝太弟
Li Yu 李煜 937–978; Houzhu 后主; 961–975

=== Wuyue ===
Wuyue rulers family tree

Qian Liu 錢鏐 850–932; Taìzǔ (太祖) r. 907–932^{1}
Qian Yuanguan 錢元瓘 887–941; Shìzōng (世宗) r. 932–941^{2}
Qian Hongzun 錢弘僔; 925–940	Qian Hongzuo 錢弘佐 928–947; Chéngzōng (成宗) r. 941–947^{3}	Qián Zōng 錢倧; 928–971 r. 947^{4}	Qian Chu 錢俶 929–988; Zhongyi (忠懿王) r. 947–978^{5}

=== Min ===
Min rulers family tree

Wang Nin 王恁
Wang Chao 王潮 b. 846–d. 898	Wang Shenzhi 王審知 b. 862–d. 925; Tàizǔ 太祖 r. 909–925	Wang Shengui 王審邽 b. 858–d. 904
Wang Yanhan 王延翰 r. 925–926; d. 927	Wang Yanjun 王延鈞 d. 935; Huìzōng 惠宗 r. 927–935	Wang Yanxi 王延羲 d. 944; Jǐngzōng (景宗) r. 939–944	Wang Yanzheng 王延政 d. 951; Tiande Emperor (天德帝) r. 943–945
Wang Jipeng 王繼鵬 d. 939; Kāngzōng (康宗) r. 935–939

=== Ma Chu ===
Ma Chu rulers family tree

Ma Yin 馬殷 (b. 853–d. 930); Wumu 楚武穆王 r. 907–930
Ma Xizhen 馬希振	Ma Xisheng 馬希聲 899–932 r. 930–932	Ma Xifan 馬希範 (899–947); Wénzhāo 文昭 r. 932–947	Ma Xiwang 馬希旺 d. ~933	Ma Xigao 馬希杲 d. 945	Mǎ Xī'è 馬希萼 r. 950–951	Mǎ Xīchóng 馬希崇 b.912 r. 950–951	Mǎ Xīguǎng 馬希廣 d.950 r. 947–950
Mǎ Guānghuì 马光惠

=== Southern Han ===
Southern Han rulers family tree

Liu Zhiqian 劉知謙 (d. 894)
Liu Yin 劉隱 b. 874–d. 911	Liu Yan 劉龑 889–942; Gaozu 高祖 r. 917–942	Liu Tai 劉台
Emperor; Huizong of Min	Liu Hua 劉華 b. 896–d. 930	Liu Hongchang 劉弘昌 d. 944; Prince of Yue 越王	Liu Bin 劉玢 920–943; Shāng 殤皇 r. 942–943	Liu Sheng 劉晟 920–958; Zhongzong r. 943–958	Liu Honggao 劉弘杲 d. 943; Prince of Xun 循王
Liu Chang 劉鋹; 942–980 r. 958–971

=== Jingnan ===
Jingnan rulers family tree

Gao Jixing 高季興 b. 858–d. 929; Wǔxìng 武信 r. 924–928
Gao Conghui 高從誨 891–948; Wénxiàn 文獻 r. 928–948
Gao Baoxu 高保勗 924–962; Zhenan 貞安王 r. 960–962	Gao Baorong 高保融 920–960; Zhenyi 貞懿王 r. 948–960
Gao Jichong 高繼沖 943–973; Deren 德仁王 r. 962–963

== Song dynasty ==
The following is a simplified family tree for the Song dynasty, which ruled China between 960 and 1279. The names given are temple names, the form by which Song Emperors are most commonly known (with the exception of the last emperor, Bing, who is simply known by his given name). The Song dynasty is often divided into the Northern Song (960–1127), which ended when the Song lost control of Northern China to the Jin dynasty, and the Southern Song (1127–1279).

Song dynasty

– Northern Song emperors
– Southern Song emperors
A dashed line denotes an adoption

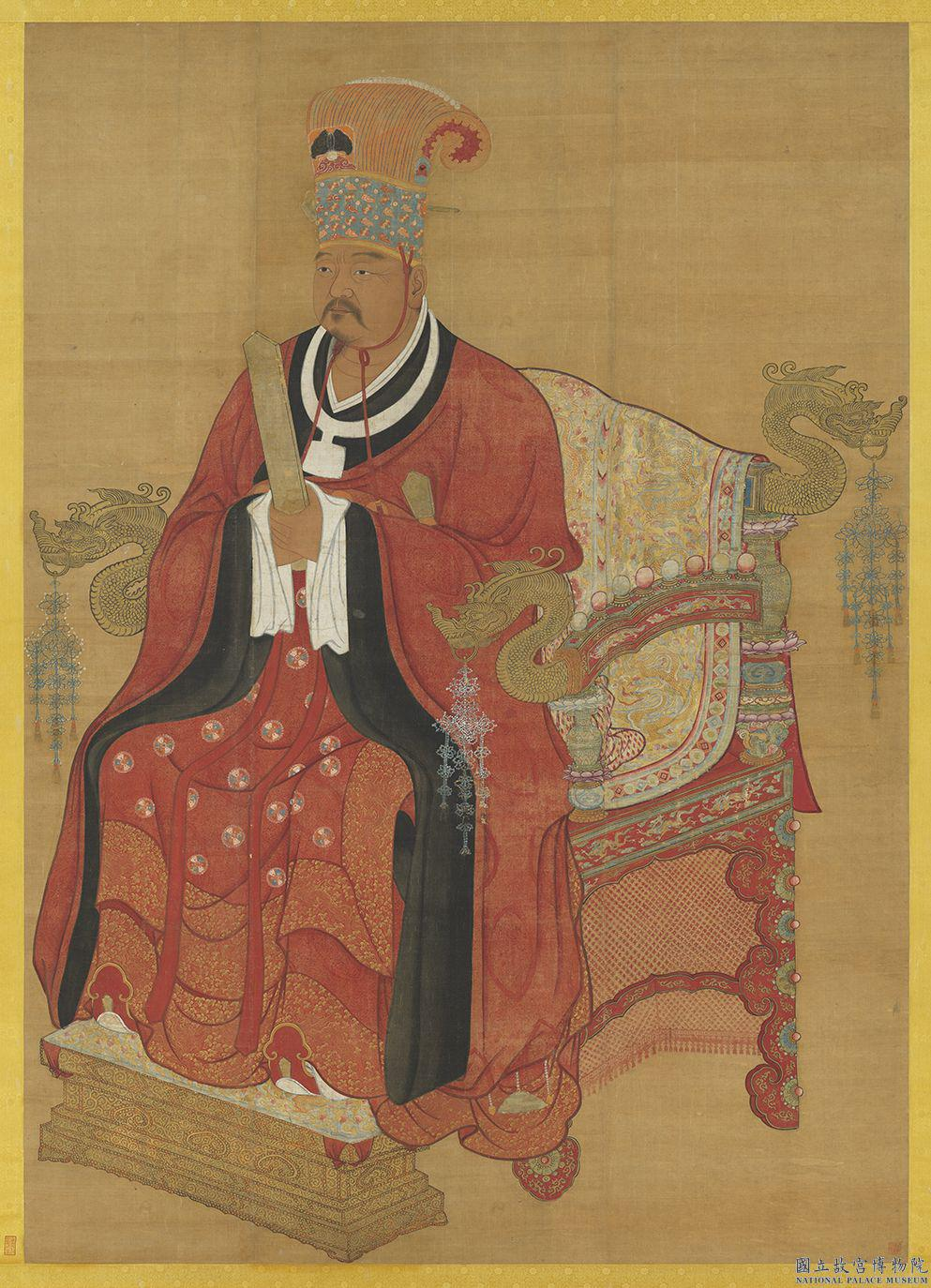
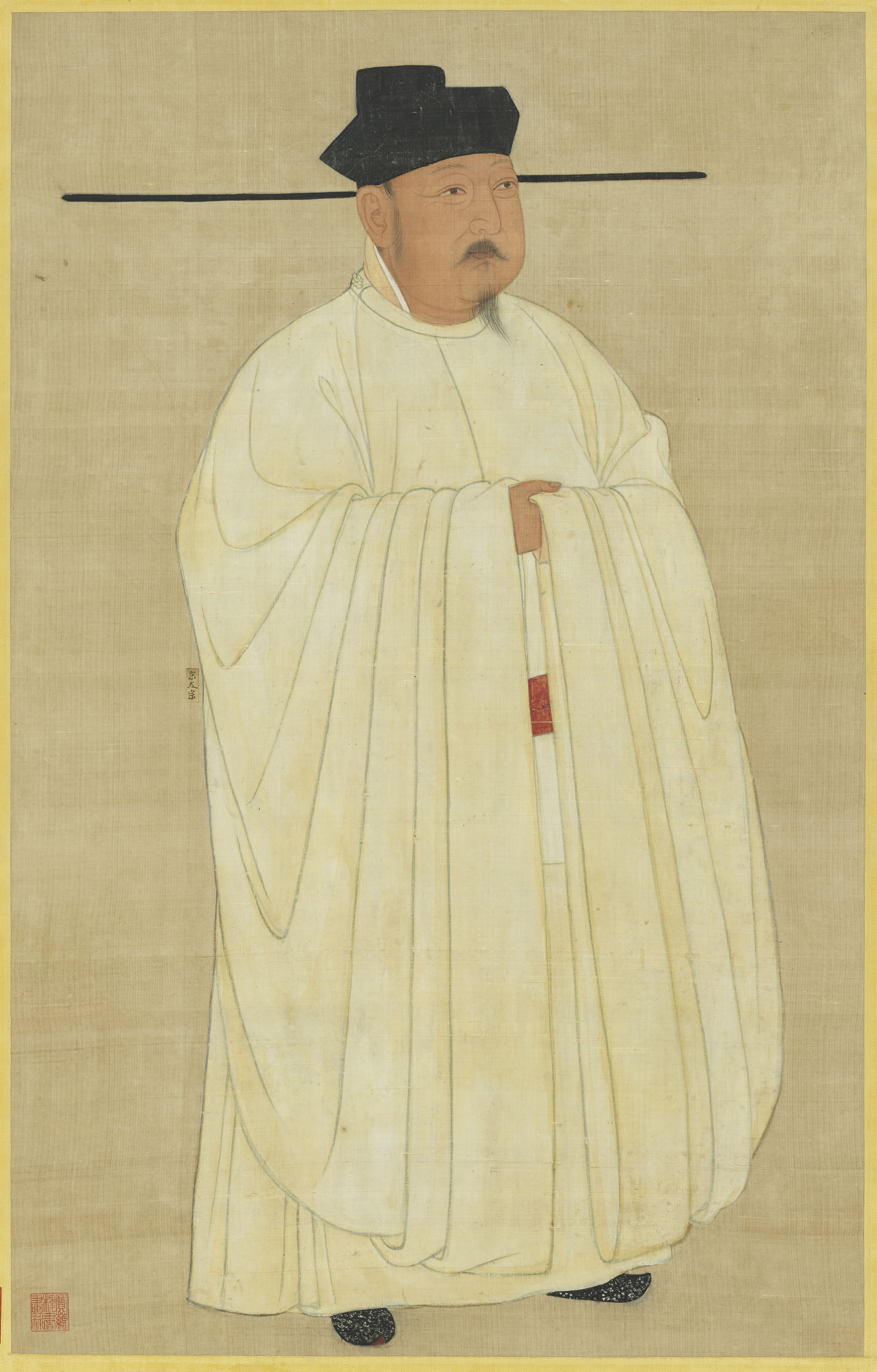
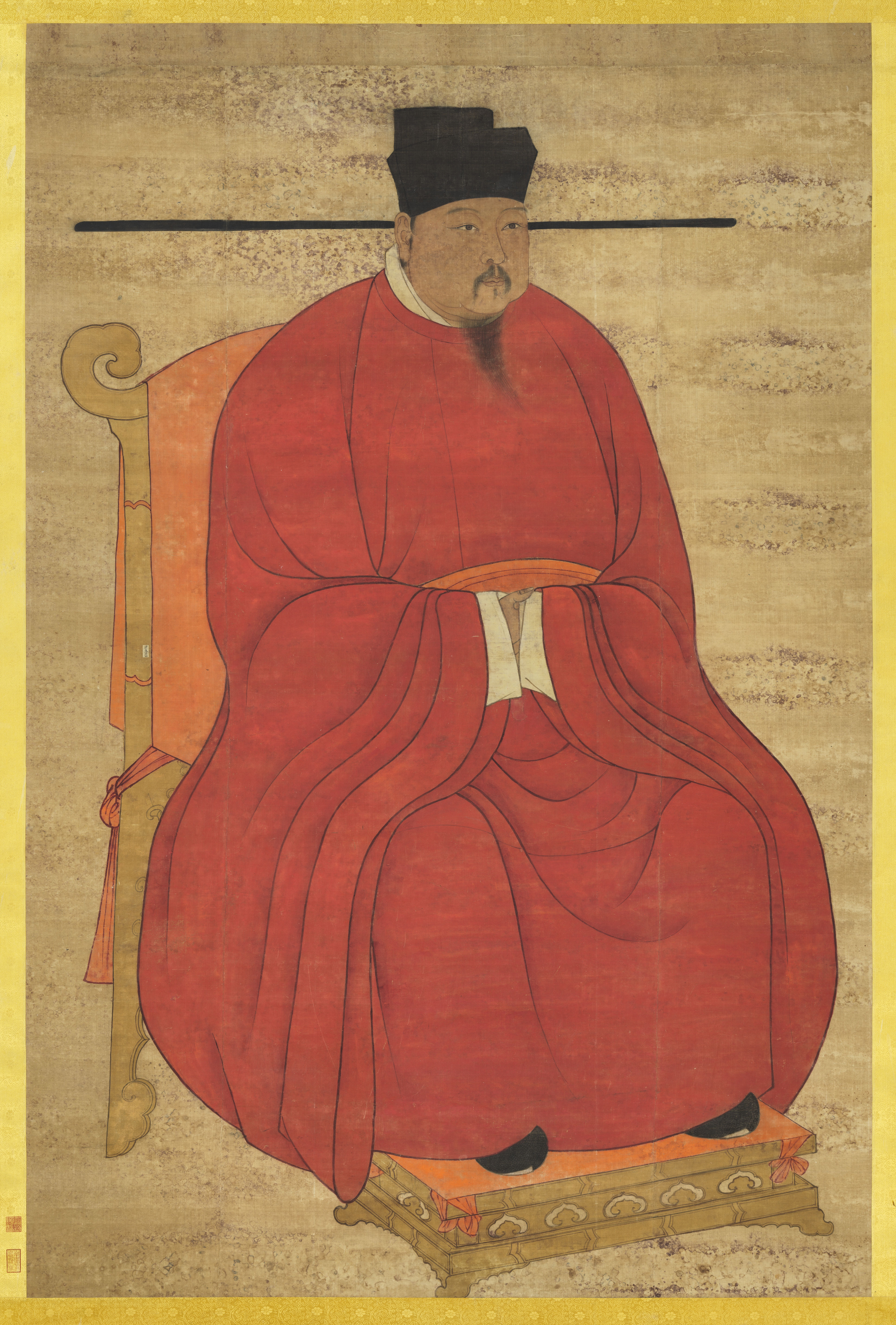
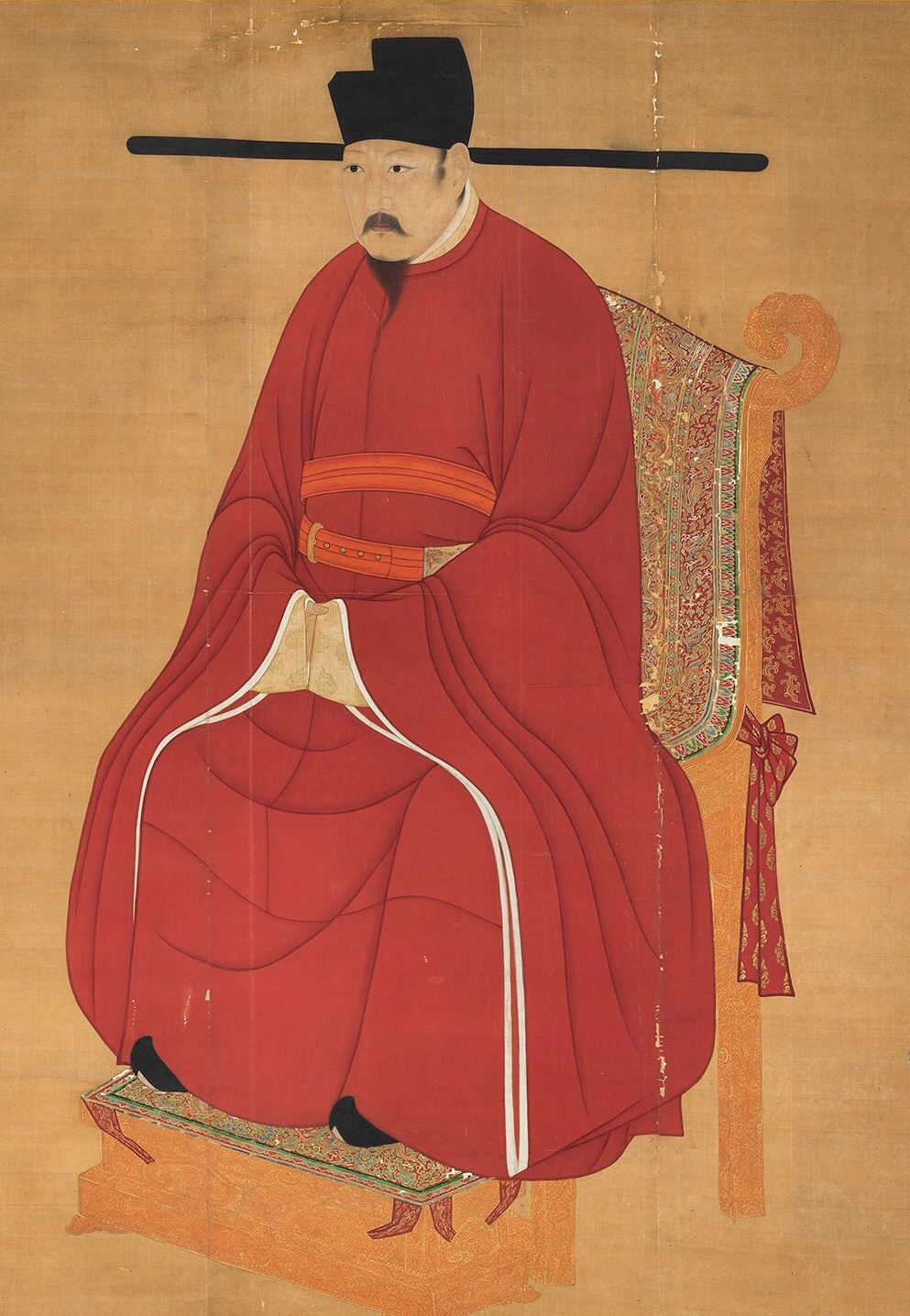
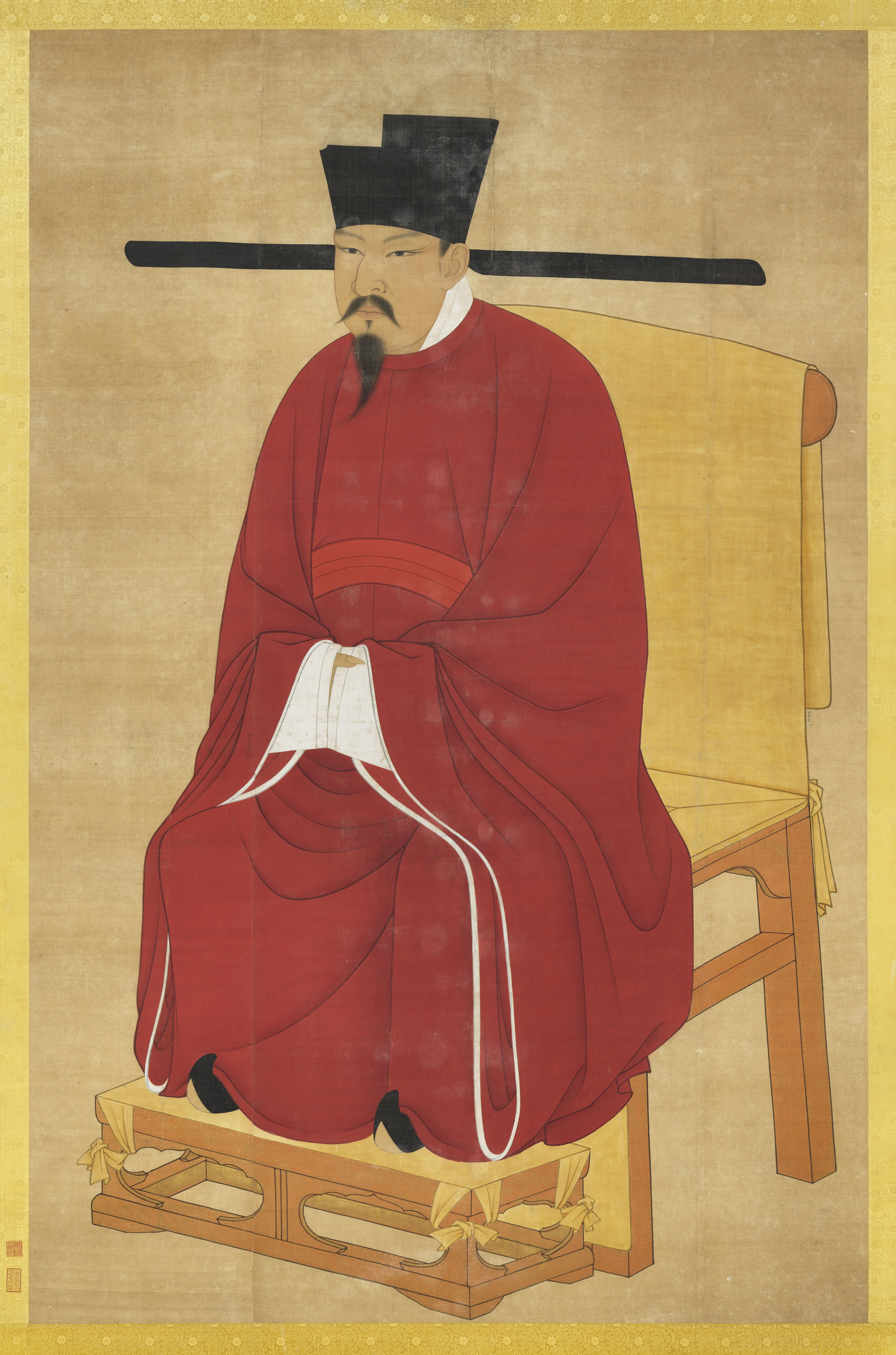
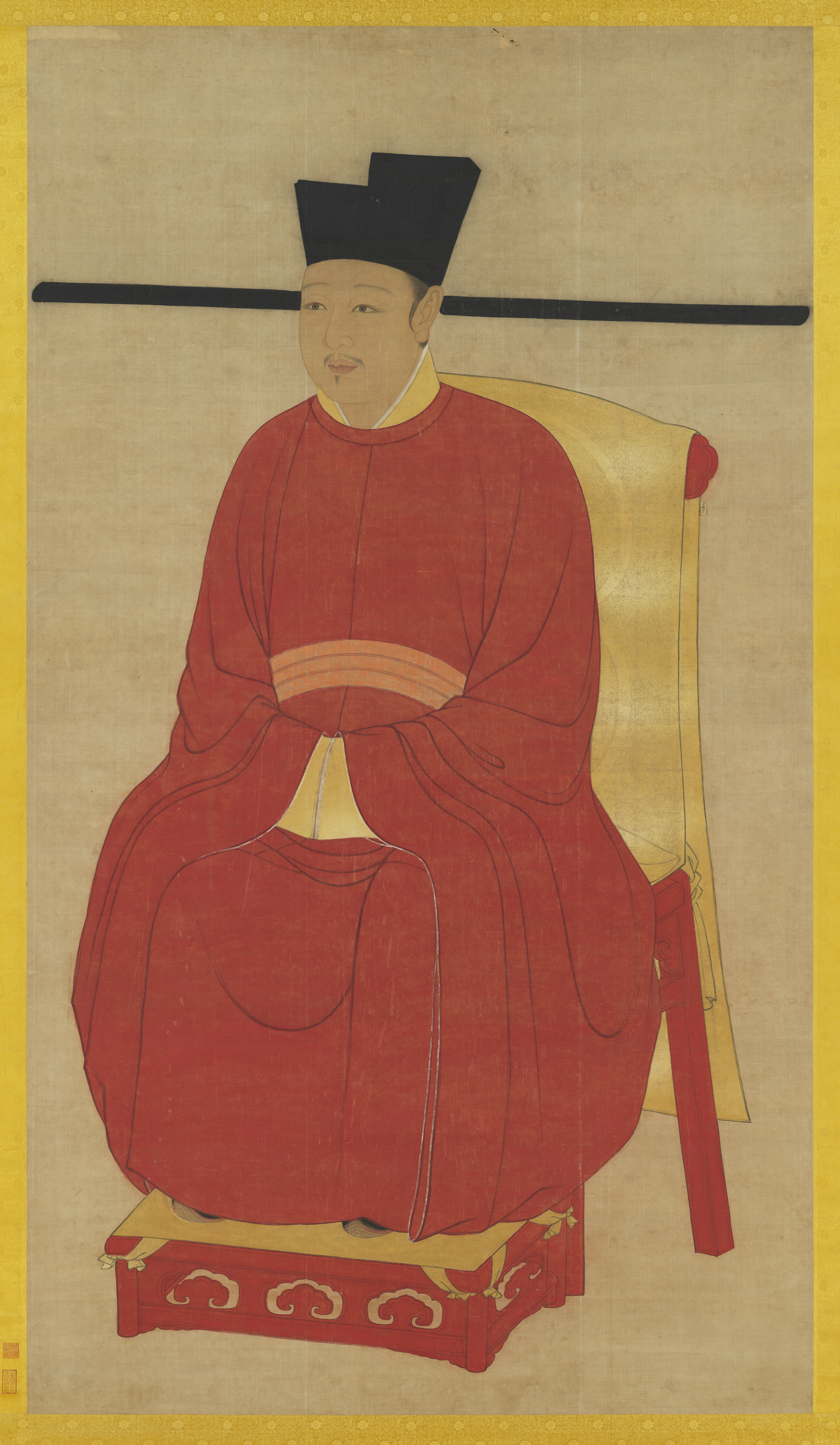
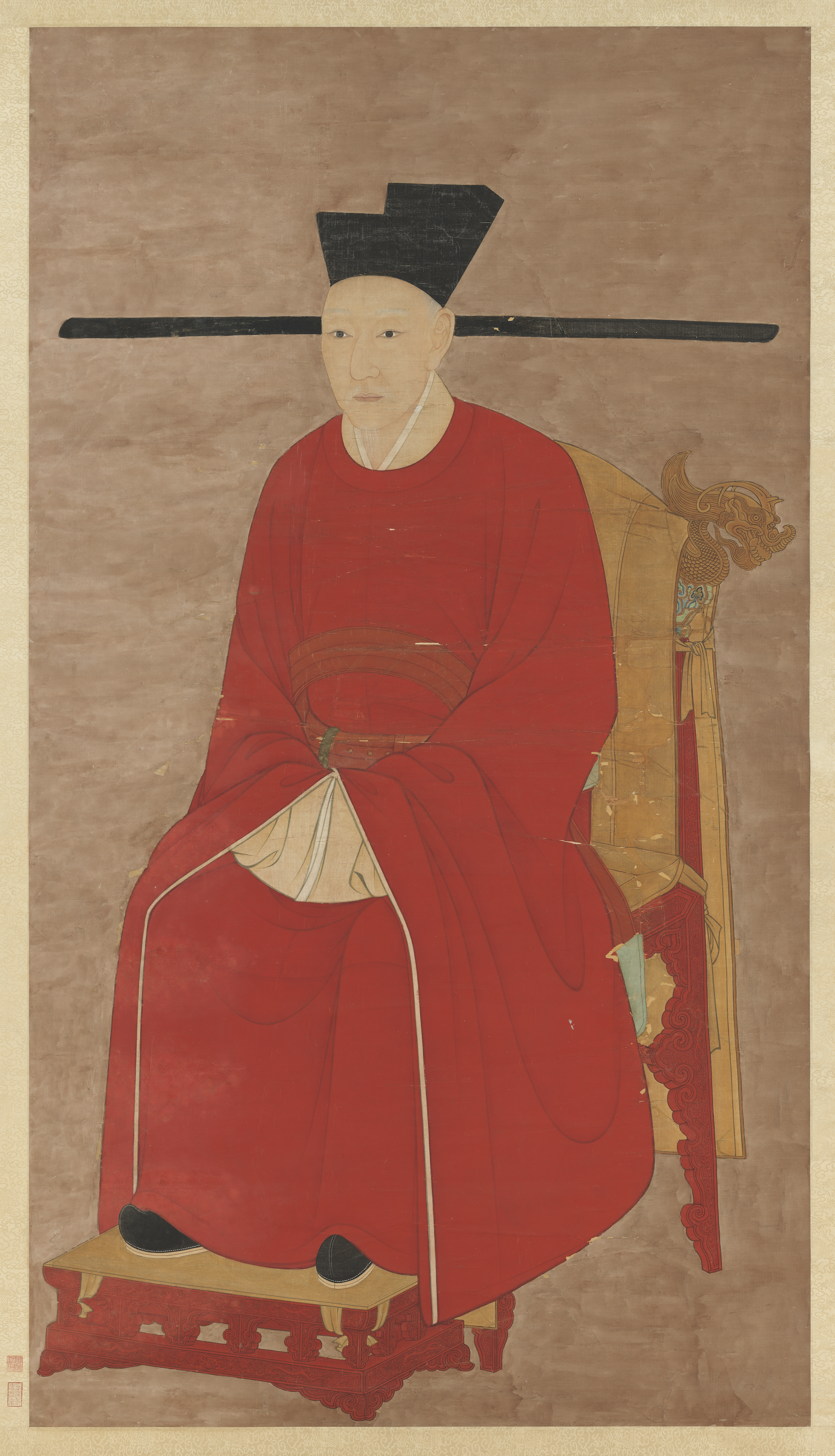
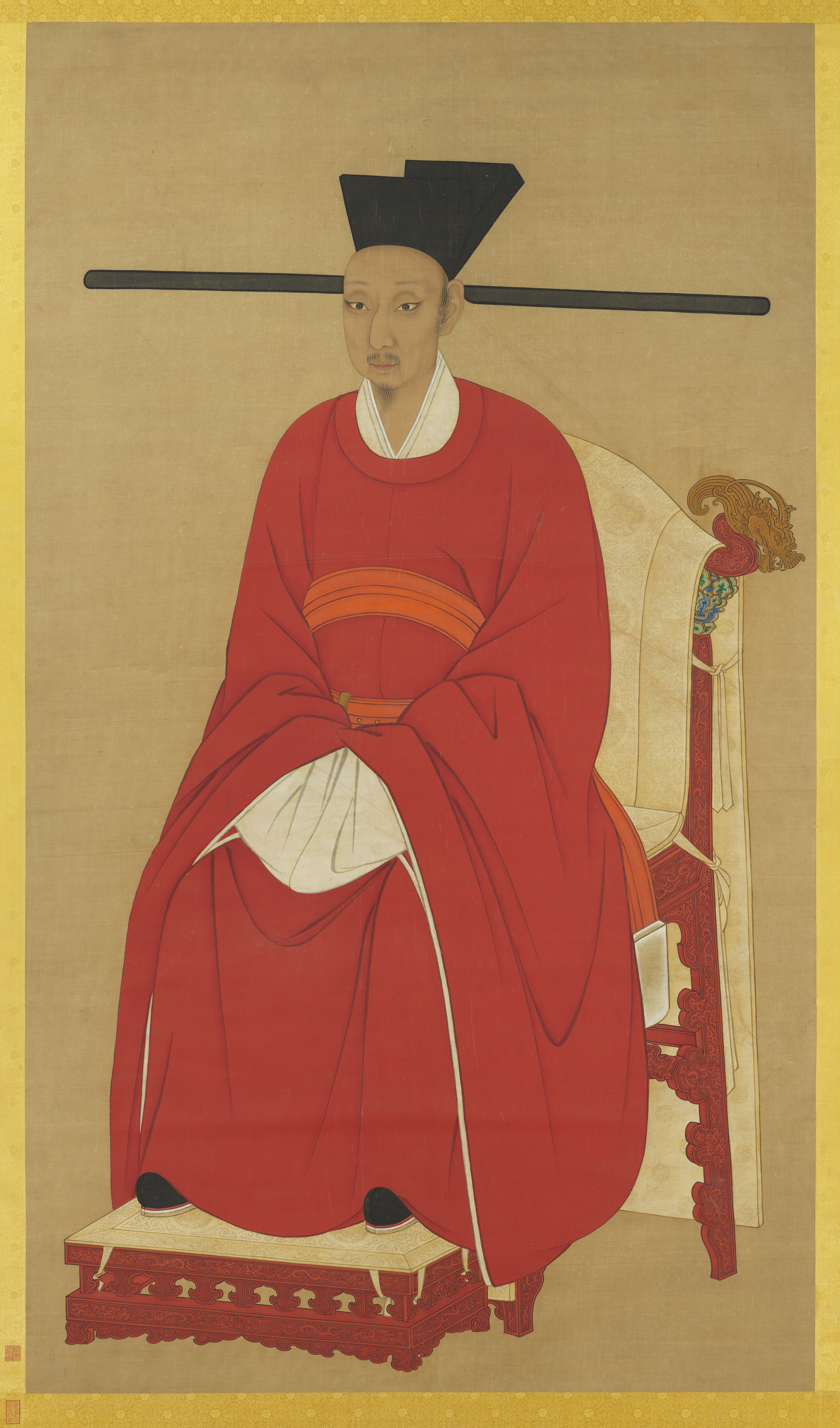
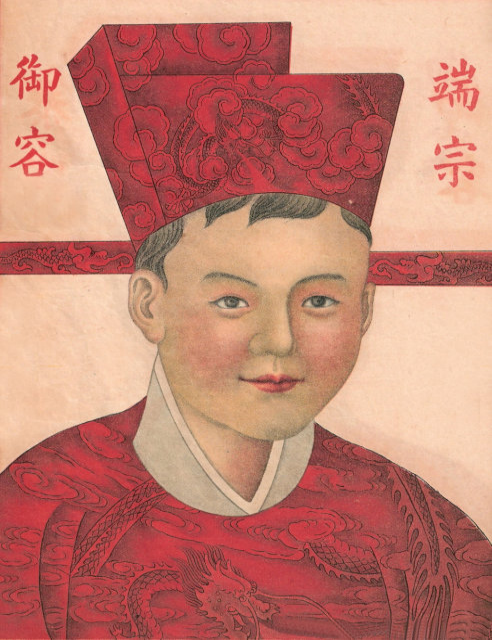
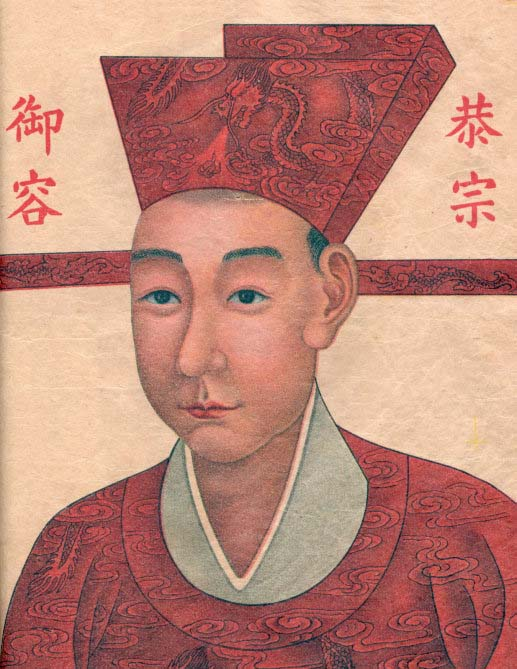
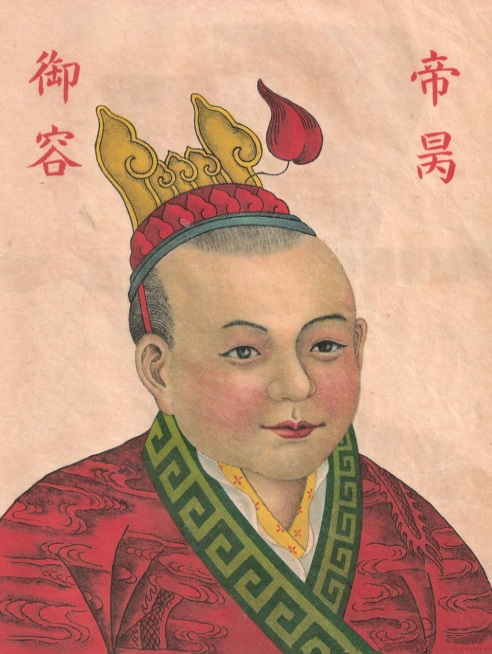
Zhao Hongyin 趙弘殷 899–956 Xuanzu 宣祖
2	3
Zhao Kuangyin 趙匡胤; 927–976 Taizu 太祖; 960–976	Zhao Guangyi 趙光義; 939–997 Taizong 太宗; 976–997
2	4	3	4
Zhao Dezhao 趙德昭 951–979; Prince Yi of Yan 燕懿王	Zhao Defang 趙德芳 959–981; Prince Kanghui of Qin 秦康惠王	Zhao Heng 趙恆; 968–1022 Zhenzong 真宗; 997–1022	Zhao Yuanfen 趙元份 969–1005; Prince Gongjing of Shang 商恭靖王
2	2	6	3
Zhao Weiji 趙惟吉 966-1010; Prince Ji 冀王	Zhao Weixian 趙惟憲; 979–1016; Duke of Ying 英國公	Zhao Zhen 趙禎; 1010–1063 Renzong 仁宗; 1022–1063	Zhao Yunrang 趙允讓 995–1059; Prince Anyi of Pu 濮安懿王
4	3	13
Zhao Shoudu 趙守度; Marquess of Lujiang 廬江侯	Zhao Congyu 趙從郁; Marquess of Xinxing 新興侯	Zhao Shu 趙曙 1032–1067 Yingzong 英宗; 1063–1067
1
Zhao Shikuo 趙世括; Duke of Jia 嘉國公	Zhao Shijiang 趙世將; Marquess of Huayin 華陰侯	Zhao Xu 趙頊 1048–1085 Shenzong 神宗; 1067–1085
6	11
Zhao Lingjia 趙令稼; Duke of Fang 房國公	Zhao Linghua 趙令譮; Duke of Qing 慶國公	Zhao Xu 趙煦; 1076–1100 Zhezong 哲宗; 1085–1100	Zhao Ji 趙佶 1082–1135 Huizong 徽宗; 1100–1126
1	9
Zhao Zishi 趙子奭; Duke of Wu 吳國公	Zhao Zicheng 趙子偁 d.1143 Prince Anxi of Xiu 秀安僖王	Zhao Huan 趙桓; 1100–1161 Qinzong 欽宗; 1126–1127	Zhao Gou 趙構 1107–1187 Gaozong 高宗; 1127–1162
2
Zhao Bowu 趙伯旿; Duke of Yi 益國公	Zhao Shen 趙昚 1127–1194 Xiaozong 孝宗; 1162–1189
3
Zhao Shiyi 趙師意; Duke of Zhao 趙國公	Zhao Dun 趙惇 1147–1200 Guangzong 光宗; 1189–1194
2
Zhao Xilu 趙希瓐; Prince Rong 榮王	Zhao Kuo 趙擴 1168–1224 Ningzong 寧宗; 1194–1224
1	2
Zhao Yun 趙昀 1205–1264 Lizong 理宗; 1224–1264	Zhao Yurui 趙與芮 1207–1287; Prince Rong 榮王
Zhao Mengqi 趙孟啓 1240–1274 Duzong 度宗; 1264–1274
1	2	3
Zhao Shi 趙昰 1268–1278 Duanzong 端宗; 1276–1278	Zhao Xian 趙顯 1271–1323 Gongdi 恭帝; 1274–1276	Zhao Bing 趙昺; 1271–1279 Bing 昺 1278–1279

== Liao, Jin, Western Xia dynasties ==
=== Liao dynasty ===
The following is a simplified family tree for the Liao dynasty, which ruled much of northern China between 916 and 1125. The names given are temple names, the form by which Liao Emperors are most commonly known (with the exception of the last emperor, Emperor Tianzuo, who was not awarded a temple name).

Yelü clan – Liao dynasty

- – Liao dynasty emperors
- – Dongdan Kingdom rulers
- – Northern Liao rulers
- – Western Liao rulers
- – Tribal leaders

Yelü Nieli 耶律涅里
Yelü Pidie 耶律毗牒
Yelü Keling 耶律頦領
Yelü Noulisi 耶律耨里思; Suzu 肅祖
Yelü Salade 耶律薩剌德; Yizu 遼懿祖
Yelü Yundeshi 耶律勻德實; Xuanzu 遼玄祖
Yelü Saladi 耶律撤剌的; Dezu 遼德祖
Yelü Abaoji 耶律阿保機; Taizu 太祖; 872–907–926	Yelü Anduan 耶律安端 ?–947–952
Yelü Bei 耶律倍; Yizong 遼義宗; 899–926- 930–937	Queen Xiao of Dongdan Kingdom 人皇王妃蕭氏 ?–930–940	Yelü Deguang 耶律德光; Taizong 太宗; 902–926–947	Yelü Lihu 耶律李胡; 911–960; Zhangsudi 遼章肅帝	□
Yelü Ruan 耶律阮; Shizong 世宗; 918–947–951	Yelü Jing 耶律璟; Muzong 穆宗; 931–951–969	□
Yelü Xian 耶律賢; Jingzong 景宗; 948–969–982	□
Yelü Longxu 耶律隆緒; Shengzong 聖宗; 971–982–1031	□
Yelü Zongzhen 耶律宗真; Xingzong 興宗; 1015–1031–1055	Liáo sì Yuándì 遼嗣元帝
Yelü Hongji 耶律洪基; Daozong 道宗; 1032–1055–1101	Yelü Hélǔwò 耶律和魯斡 仁聖皇太叔 ?–1110	Yelü Āliǎn 耶律阿璉 ?–1087	□
Yelü Jun 耶律浚; 1057–1077; Shunzong 順宗	Yelü Chun 耶律淳; Xuanzong 宣宗; 1062–1122	Empress Dowager; Xiao Puxiannü 蕭普賢女 ?–1122	Yelü Zhulie 耶律朮烈; Yingzong 英宗 ?–1123	Yelü Dashi 耶律大石; Dezong 德宗; 1087–1124–1143	Xiao Tabuyan 蕭塔不煙; Empress Gantian 感天皇后 ?–1143–1150
Yelü Yangxi 耶律延禧; 1075–1128; Tianzuodi 天祚帝; 1101–1125	Empress Dowager; Xiao Feng 蕭德妃 ?–1122–1123	Yelü Yilie 耶律夷列; Renzong 仁宗 ?–1150–1163	Yelü Pusuwan 耶律普速完; Empress Dowager; Chengtian 承天太后 ?–1163–1178
Yelü Yali 耶律雅里; 1094–1123	Yelü Ding ?–1122–1123	Yelü Zhilugu 耶律直魯古; Mozhu 末主 / Modi 末帝 ?–1178–1211–1213	Taibuqa; Tayang Khan of Naimans ?–1211
Princess Húnhū 渾忽公主	Küçlüg 屈出律; Usurper of Qara Khitai ?–1211–1218

=== Jin dynasty ===
The following is a simplified family tree for the Jin dynasty. Arising from a family of Jurchen chieftains (whose inaugural years of rule are given in brackets), the dynasty was declared by Aguda in 1115; in 1125 his successor Wuqimai conquered the Liao dynasty. The Jin ruled much of northern China until their conquest by the Mongol Empire 1234. They were the cultural 'ancestors' of the Qing dynasty, which was initially named the Later Jin in recognition of this heritage. The names given are temple names, the form by which Jin emperors are most commonly known (with the exceptions of the Prince of Hailing, Prince Shao of Wei and Emperor Mo; these are posthumous names, as temple names were not awarded).

Emperors family tree

Hanpu 函普; Shizu 始祖
Wulu 烏魯; Emperor De 德皇帝
Bahai 跋海; Emperor An 安皇帝
Suike 綏可; Xianzu 獻祖
Shilu 石魯; Zhaozu 昭祖
Wugunai 烏骨迺; Jingzu 景祖; ~1050–(1021–)1074
Helibo 劾里缽; Shizu 世祖; 1039–(1074–)1092	Polashu 頗刺淑; Suzong 肅宗; 1042–(1092–)1094	Yingge 盈歌; Muzong 穆宗; 1053–(1094–)1103	Hezhe 劾者 d. 1121
Wuyashu 烏雅束; Kangzong 康宗; 1061–(1103–)1113	Aguda 阿骨打; Taizu 太祖; 1068–(1113–)1115–1123	Wuqimai 吳乞買; Taizong 太宗; 1075–1123–1135	□	Sagai 撒改
Wanyan Zongjun 完顏宗峻 d. 1124; Huizong 徽宗	Wanyan Zonggan 完顏宗幹 d. 1141; Dezong 德宗	Wanyan Zongfu 完顏宗輔; 1096–1135; Ruizong 睿宗	Nianhan 粘罕; 1080–1136
Hela 合剌; Xizong 熙宗; 1119–1135–1149	Wanyan Liang 完顏亮; Pr. of Hailing 海陵王; 1122–1149–1161	Wanyan Yong 完顏雍; Shizong 世宗; 1123–1161–1189
Wanyan Yungong 完顏允恭; 1146–1185; Xianzong 顯宗	Wanyan Yongji 完顏永濟; Pr. Shao of Wei 衛紹王; 1168–1209–1213
Wanyan Jing 完顏璟; Zhangzong 章宗; 1168–1190–1208	Wanyan Xun 完顏珣; Xuanzong 宣宗; 1163–1213–1224
Wanyan Shouxu 完顏守緒 1234; Aizong 哀宗; 1198–1224–1234
Wanyan Chenglin 完顏承麟; Emperor Mo 末帝 r. 1234; d. 1234

=== Western Xia and Dingnan Jiedushi ===
The following is a family tree of the military governor (Jiedushi) of Dingnan Circuit, the region that eventually evolved into the independent state of Western Xia, that existed between 1038 and 1227, followed by the family tree of the Western Xia emperors.

The Tuoba clan of the Xianbei of Tuyuhun founded the Western Xia. After the Tibetans destroyed the Tuyuhun in 670, its famous prince, Tuoba Chici, who controlled the Dangxiang Qiang submitted to the Tang, which "bestowed" upon him the royal name of Li (李). Towards the end of the Tang, the Tuoba brought troops to suppress the Huang Chao Rebellion (874–884) on behalf of the Tang court and took control of the Xia State, or Xia Zhou, in northern Shaanxi in 881. After the Tang fell in 907, the Tuoba descendants formally declared resistance against the expanding Northern Song in 982 and proclaimed independence to establish the Western Xia in 1038.

The foundation of Western Xia goes back to the year 982 under Li Jiqian. However, only in 1038 did the Tangut chieftain Li Yuanhao (son of Li Deming, named himself emperor of Da Xia and demanded the Song emperor recognise him as an equal. The Song court recognised Li Yuanhao as governor but not as "emperor", a title it regarded as exclusive to the Song emperor. After intense diplomatic contacts, in 1043 the Tangut state accepted the recognition of the Song emperor as emperor in exchange for annual gifts, which implied tacit recognition on the part of the Song of the military power of the Tanguts.

Family tree of the Western Xia emperors and the rulers of Dingnan

Possibly; Dai state ancestor? (family)
skipped generations
Li/Tuoba Chici 李/拓跋赤辭 ?–?–634–?
skipped generations
DINGNAN; JIEDUSHI
Tuoba Chongjian 拓跋重建
Li Sijing 李思敬	Li/Tuoba Sigong 李/拓跋思恭 ?v881–886	Li Siyao 李思瑤	Li Sixiao 李思孝	Li Sijian 李思諫 ?–895–896–908	Li Sizhong 李思忠
Li Renyou 李仁祐	Li Chengqing 李成慶; 896–?	Li Renfu 李仁福 ?–909–931	□	Li Renyan 李仁顏
Li Yiyun 李彝氳	Li Yixing 李彝興 ?–935–967	Li Yichao 李彝超 ?–933–935	Li Yiwen 李彝溫	Li Yimin 李彝敏 d. 943	Li Yijin 李彝謹	Li Yijun 李彝俊	Li Yichang 李彝昌 ?–908–909/910	Li Yijing 李彝景
Li Kexian 李克憲	Li Guangmei 李光美	Li Guangsui 李光遂	Li Kerui 李克睿; 935–967–978	Li Kexin 李克信	Li Guanglian 李光璉	Li Guangyi 李光義	Li Guangyan 李光儼
Li Guangpu 李光普	Li Guangxin 李光新	Li Kewen 李克文	Li Jiyun 李繼筠; 957–978–979	Li Jipeng 李繼捧; 957–980–982 –988–994–1004	Li Guangxiu 李光琇	Li Guanglin 李光璘	Li Guangcong 李光琮	Li Jiqian 李繼遷; 963–982–1004	Li Jichong	Li Jiyuan 李繼瑗
Liyongge 李永哥	Li Pilu 李丕祿	Li Deming 李德明; 981–1004–1032
WESTERN; XIA
Li Yuanhao 李元昊; 1003–1048; Jingzong r. 1038–1048^{1}	Li Chengyu 李成遇	Li Chengwei
嵬名錫狸	嵬名阿哩	嵬名寧明	嵬名寧令哥	□	Li Liangzuo 李諒祚 (1047–1068); Yizong r. 1048–1068^{2}
Li Bingchang 李秉常; 1061–1086; Huizong 嵬名秉常 r. 1068–1086^{3}
Li Qianshun 李乾順 (1084–1139); Chongzong r. 1086–1139^{4}	嵬名察哥
Li Renxiao 李仁孝 (1124–1193); Renzong 仁宗 r. 1139–1193^{5}	Li Renyou 李仁友
Li Yanzong 李彥宗	Li Chunyou 李純佑 (1177–1206); Huanzong 桓宗 r. 1193–1206^{6}	Li Anquan 李安全; 1170–1211; Xiangzong 襄宗 r. 1206–1211^{7}
Li Zunxu 李遵頊 (1163–1226); Shenzong 神宗 r. 1211–1223^{8}	嵬名承禎
Li Deren 李德任	Li Dewang 李德旺 (1181–1226); Xianzong 獻宗 r. 1223–1226^{9}	清平郡王
Li Xian 李睍 (d. 1227); Modi/ Mozhu r. 1226–1227^{10}
