= History of Jin =

Chinese historical text

- Traditional Chinese: 金史
- Simplified Chinese: 金史
Transcriptions
Standard Mandarin
- Hanyu Pinyin: Jin Shi
Southern Min
- Hokkien POJ: Kim-sú

The History of Jin (Jin Shi) is a Chinese historical text, one of the Twenty Four Histories, which details the history of the Jin dynasty founded by the Jurchens in northern China. It was compiled by the Yuan dynasty historian and minister Toqto'a.

== History of compilation ==
Although the Jin dynasty was destroyed by the Mongols in 1234, the initiative for writing a dynastic history - in accordance with Chinese political traditions - was only begun under Kublai Khan, who had decided to embrace Chinese political norms and found the Yuan dynasty. In 1261 the idea of compiling histories for both the Jin and Liao dynasties was first mooted, and after the conquest of Southern Song, the project was expanded to compile all three histories.

Issues with the format and rules of compilation, however, hampered progress, and it was only in 1343 that the imperial commission was finalised, with Toqto'a as the overseer, and a team of six, including the scholar Ouyang Xuan, as chief compilers. The work was completed in just over a year.

For its material, the History of Jin drew heavily on the historical records of the Jin dynasty itself, while the events of its final years drew heavily on the private works and records of scholars such as Yuan Haowen, Liu Qi, Yang Huan and others.

The History of Jin was translated into Manchu as ᠠᡳᠰᡳᠨ
ᡤᡠᡵᡠᠨ ‍‍ᡳ
ᠰᡠᡩᡠᡵᡳ (Wylie: Aisin gurun i suduri, Möllendorff: Aisin gurun i suduri).

The Qianlong Emperor of the Qing dynasty used the Manchu language to "correct" Chinese character transcriptions of Jurchen language names in the History of Jin in his "Imperial Liao Jin Yuan Three Histories National Language Explanation" (欽定遼金元三史國語解) project.

Qianlong's "corrections" ended up compounding the errors and making the transcription of some foreign words even worse. Marshall Broomhall wrote that "So unscientific was this work that the K'ien-lung editions of the Liao, Kin, and Yüan histories are practically useless." Emil Bretschneider demonstrated how the etymologies in the Qianlong edition were incorrect.

== Layout ==
The History of Jin contains a total of 135 scrolls, or chapters, divided as follows:

- 19 Annals or imperial biographies (本紀), detailing the lives of Jin emperors
- 39 Treatises (志), detailing facts of economic and social history during the period
- 4 Chronological tables (表)
- 71 Biographies (列傳), detailing lives of important people during the period

Within the Annals, volume 1 contains a description of the ancestral records of the founding Wanyan clan, their origin in the Heishui Mohe peoples of Outer Manchuria, and ancestral figures, including Hanpu, Wugunai, Shilu, Helibo, and Wuyashu. Tillman explains the background to this volume in English. Volume 19 includes some early figures of the Jin dynasty who were given posthumous titles, including Wanyuan Zongjun 完颜宗峻 (d. 1124), Wanyan Zongyao 完顏宗堯 (1096-1135), and Wanyan Yungong 完颜允恭 (1146-1185)

Within the Treatises, volumes 25-26 describe the geographic divisions of the Jin, organized by the primary level administrative division of circuit (路). The section Finance and Economics (食貨) spans volumes 46–50, Selection of Officials (選舉) spans volumes 51–54, Official Posts (百官) spans volumes 55–58. Volume 57 describes the unique Miŋgan Moumukə 猛安謀克 social system of the Jurchen. Volume 2 confirms Aguda as du begile 都勃極烈 or supreme chief in this system. Biographies of a number of tribal unit chiefs with title begile 勃極烈 are given in volume 76.

One unusual feature of the text in comparison with other standard histories is the tabular descriptions of communication with neighboring states (交聘) in volumes 60–62.

A list of 125 Jurchen language words transcribed in Chinese characters can be found in the Jin Guoyu Jie ("Explanation of the national language of the Jin" 金國語解), an appendix to the History of Jin. It is found in Chapter 135 - 金史/卷135. Alexander Wylie translated the list into English and Manchu.

Researches on Manchu Origins contained a list of corrections of the transcribed Jurchen words found in the History of Jin in Chapter 135 - 金史/卷135, using the Manchu language to correct them, found in Chapter 18 - 滿洲源流考/卷18
