= Shizu of Jin =

Shizu of Jin may refer to:

- Emperor Wu of Jin (236–290), Emperor Shizu of Jin
- Hanpu (fl. 10th century), Jurchen chieftain, honored as Shizu (始祖) by the Jin emperors
- Helibo (1039–1092), Jurchen chieftain, honored as Shizu (世祖) by the Jin emperors
