= Emperor Jingyuan =

Emperor Jingyuan may refer to:

- Yao Yizhong (280–352), ethnic Qiang warlord and general, ancestor of the Later Qin emperors
- Hanpu (fl. 10th century), ethnic Jurchen chieftain, ancestor of the Jin emperors
