= Jingzu =

Jingzu may refer to:

- Gin people (Chinese: 京族; pinyin: Jīngzú), descendants of ethnic Vietnamese (Kinh) in China
- Ancestor veneration in China (Chinese: 敬祖; pinyin: Jìngzǔ)

== Temple name ==
- Wugunai (1021–1074), Jurchen chieftain who was honored as Jingzong in the Jin dynasty
- Giocangga (1526–1583), Jurchen chieftain who was honored as Jingzong in the Qing dynasty
