= Zhaozu =

Zhaozu is the atonal romanization of several Chinese temple names. It may refer to:

- Shilu (Jurchen) (fl. 11th century), Jurchen chieftain of the Wanyan tribe, honored as Zhaozu (昭祖) in the Jin dynasty
- Mengtemu (1370–1433), Jurchen chieftain of the Odoli tribe, honored as Zhaozu (肇祖) in the Qing dynasty
