= Xianzu =

Xianzu is the atonal romanization of several Chinese temple names. It may refer to:

- Emperor Xianwen of Northern Wei (454–476)
- Emperor Wenxuan of Northern Qi (526–559)
- Li Guochang (died 887), Shatuo Turk chieftain, honored as Xianzu during the Later Tang dynasty
- Suike (fl. late 10th or early 11th century), Jurchen chieftain, honored as Xianzu during the Jin dynasty
- Taksi (1543–1583), Jurchen chieftain, honored as Xianzu during the Qing dynasty
