= Suike =

Jurchen royalty

- Born: Unknown
- Died: Unknown
- Spouse: Empress Gongjing
- Issue: Shilu; Pudu; Abaohan; Diku; Digunai; Salinian; Sagezhou
Posthumous name
- Emperor Chunlie Dingzhao (純烈定昭皇帝)
Temple name
- Xianzu (獻祖)
- Father: Bahai
- Mother: Empress Jie

Suike
- Traditional Chinese: 綏可
- Simplified Chinese: 绥可
Transcriptions
Standard Mandarin
- Hanyu Pinyin: Suíkě

Suike was a chieftain of the Wanyan clan, the most dominant among the Jurchen tribes which later founded the Jin dynasty (1115–1234). He was the eldest of Bahai's five sons. Under Suike, the clan moved to the banks of the Anchuhu River, near modern-day Harbin.

Suike was posthumously honoured with the temple name Xianzu (獻祖) by his descendant, Emperor Xizong of Jin.

== Family ==
- Father: Bahai
- Mother: Bahai's primary consort, posthumously honoured as Empress Jie (節皇后)
- Spouse: Name unknown, posthumously honoured as Empress Gongjing (恭靖皇后)
- Sons:
  - Shilu, posthumously honoured as Emperor Zhaozu
  - Pudu (朴都)
  - Abaohan (阿保寒)
  - Diku (敵酷)
  - Digunai (敵古乃)
  - Salinian (撒里輦)
  - Sagezhou (撒葛周)

== Bibliography ==
- Chan, Hok-lam (1999). "From Tribal Chieftain to Sinitic Emperor: Leadership Contests and Succession Crises in the Jurchen-Jin State, 1115-1234". Journal of Asian History. 33 (2). JSTOR: 105–141. ISSN 0021-910X. JSTOR 41933140.
- Toqto'a (c. 1343). History of Jin. Vol. 1, 32, 63, 65.
