= Wulu (Emperor De) =

Jurchen royalty

- Born: Unknown
- Died: Unknown
- Spouse: Empress Si
- Issue: Bahai; Beilu
Posthumous name
- Emperor Yuanmu Xuande (淵穆玄德皇帝)
- Father: Hanpu
- Mother: Empress Mingyi

Wulu
- Traditional Chinese: 烏魯
- Simplified Chinese: 乌鲁
Transcriptions
Standard Mandarin
- Hanyu Pinyin: Wūlǔ

Wulu was a chieftain of the Wanyan tribe, the most dominant among the Jurchen tribes which later founded the Jin dynasty (1115–1234). He was the eldest son of Hanpu, who is regarded as the ancestor of the Wanyan clan. Wulu was given the posthumous name Emperor De (德皇帝) by his descendant, Emperor Xizong.

== Family ==
- Father: Hanpu
- Mother: Hanpu's primary consort, posthumously honoured as Empress Mingyi (明懿皇后)
- Spouse: Name unknown, posthumously honoured as Empress Si (思皇后)
- Sons:
  - Bahai
  - Beilu (輩魯)
