= Bahai (Jurchen) =

- Born: Unknown
- Died: Unknown
- Spouse: Empress Jie
- Issue: Suike; Xinde; Xiekude; Xieyibao; Xielihu
Posthumous name
- Emperor Hejing Qing'an (和靖慶安皇帝)
- Father: Wulu
- Mother: Empress Si

Bahai
- Traditional Chinese: 跋海
- Simplified Chinese: 跋海
Transcriptions
Standard Mandarin
- Hanyu Pinyin: Báhǎi

Bahai was a chieftain of the Wanyan tribe, the most dominant among the Jurchen tribes which later founded the Jin dynasty (1115–1234). He was the eldest son of Wulu.

Bahai was given the posthumous name Emperor An (安皇帝) by his descendant, Emperor Xizong.

== Family ==
- Father: Wulu
- Mother: Wulu's primary consort, posthumously honoured as Empress Si (思皇后)
- Spouse: Name unknown, posthumously honoured as Empress Jie (節皇后)
- Sons:
  - Suike, posthumously honoured as Emperor Xianzu
  - Xinde (敵酷)
  - Xiekude (敵古乃)
  - Xieyibao (撒里輦)
  - Xielihu (謝里忽)
