= Helibo =

Jin chieftain

- Born: 1039
- Died: 1092 (aged 52–53)
- Spouse: Lady Nalan; Lady Tushan; Lady Pusan; Lady Šuhu; Lady Šuhu; Lady Ukurin
- Issue: Uyašu; Akutta; Odai; Ukimai; Oe; Osai; Oje; Ukunai; Dumu; Chala; Udubu
Posthumous name
- Emperor Shenwu Shengsu (神武聖肅皇帝); Emperor Dasheng (大聖皇帝) (from 1150–1161)
Temple name
- Shizu (世祖); Yuanzu (元祖) (from 1150–1161)
- Father: Wugunai
- Mother: Lady Tankko (Dobaujin)

Helibo
- Traditional Chinese: 劾里鉢
- Simplified Chinese: 劾里钵
Transcriptions
Standard Mandarin
- Hanyu Pinyin: Hélǐbó
- Wade–Giles: Ho-li-po

Helibo, alternatively rendered as Horimbo (1039–1092), was a chieftain of the Wanyan tribe, the most dominant among the Jurchen tribes which later founded the Jin dynasty (1115–1234). He was the second son of Wugunai. Like his grandfather, Shilu, Horimbo was appointed chieftain of the Wanyan tribe by the Khitan-led Liao dynasty, which ruled northern China between the 10th and 11th centuries.

In 1145, Horimbo was posthumously honoured with the temple name Shizu (世祖) by his descendant, Emperor Xizong of the Jin dynasty.

== Family ==
Parents

- Father: Wugunai
- Mother: Lady Tankko (唐括氏), posthumously honoured as Empress Zhaosu (昭肃皇后)

Consorts and issue

- Empress Yijian, of the Nalan clan (翼簡皇后 拏懶氏, d. 1085)
  - Wanyan Uyašu, Emperor Kangzong (金康宗完顏烏雅束, 1061 – 1113), 1st son
  - Wanyan Aguda, Emperor Taizu (金太祖完顏阿骨打, 1 August 1068 – 19 September 1123), 2nd son
  - Wanyan Odai (斡帶), Prince Dingsu of Wei (魏定肅王 完顏斡带), 3rd son
  - Wanyan Sheng, Emperor Taizong (金太宗完顏晟, 25 November 1075 – 9 February 1135), 4th son
  - Wanyan Gao, Prince Zhilie of Liao (遼智烈王 完顏杲, d. September 1130), 5th son
- Concubine, of the Tudan clan (次室徒单氏)
  - Wnayan Osei, Prince of Wei (衛王完顏斡賽), 6th son
  - Wanyan Oje, Prince of Lu (魯王 完顏斡者), 7th son
- Concubine, of the Pusan clan (次室仆散氏)
  - Wanyan Wugunai, Prince of Han (漢王 完顏烏故乃), 8th son
- Concubine, of Šuhu clan (次室术虎氏)
  - Wanyan Dumu, Prince Zhuangxiang of Lu (魯莊襄王 完顏闍母), 9th son
- Concubine, of Šuhu clan (次室术虎氏)
  - Wanyan Chala, Prince of Yi (沂王 完顏查剌), 10th son
- Concubine, of the Ukurin clan (烏古論氏)
  - Wanyan Ang, Prince of Yun (鄆王 完顏昂), 11th son
