= Hanpu =

Jurchen clan leader

Hanpu (Chinese: 函普; pinyin: Hánpǔ), later Wanyan Hanpu (Chinese: 完顏函普), was a leader of the Jurchen Wanyan clan in the early tenth century. According to the ancestral story of the Wanyan clan, Hanpu came from Goryeo when he was sixty years old, reformed Jurchen customary law, and then married a sixty-year-old local woman who bore him three children. His descendants eventually united Jurchen tribes into a federation and established the Jin dynasty in 1115. Hanpu was retrospectively given the temple name Shizu (始祖) and the posthumous name Emperor Yixian Jingyuan (懿憲景元皇帝) by the Jin dynasty.

Chinese historians have long debated whether Hanpu was of Silla, Goryeo, or Jurchen ethnicity. Since the 1980s, they have chiefly argued that he was a Jurchen who had lived in Silla, the state that had dominated the Korean Peninsula until it was destroyed by Goryeo in 935. Western scholars usually treat Hanpu's story as a legend, but agree that it hints to contacts between some Jurchen clans and the states of Goryeo and Balhae (a state located between Jurchen lands and Silla until it was destroyed in 926) in the early tenth century. In Korea, a recent KBS history special treated Hanpu as a native Silla man who moved north and settled in Jurchen lands during the demise of Silla.

== Name ==
Hanpu is known under different transliterations in Chinese sources. He is called Kanfu (龕福) in the Songmo Jiwen (松漠紀聞; after 1155), the memoirs of a Song Chinese ambassador who was forced to stay in Jin territory for more than 10 years starting in 1131. The Shenlu Ji 神麓記, a lost book cited in the Collected Documents on the Treaties with the North during Three Reigns (三朝北盟會編; c. 1196), refers to him as Kenpu (掯浦), whereas Research on the Origin of the Manchus (滿洲源流考; 1777) calls him Hafu (哈富).

== Ancestor of the Wanyan clan ==
Because the early Jurchens had no written records, the story of Hanpu was first transmitted orally. According to the History of Jin (compiled in the 1340s), Hanpu was originally from Balhae. He arrived from Goryeo at the age of sixty and settled among the Jurchen Wanyan clan. Other sources claim that Hanpu was from Silla, the state that had ruled the Korean peninsula but was annexed by the kingdom of Goryeo in 935. The same story recounts that when Hanpu left Goryeo, his two brothers remained behind, one in Goryeo and one in the Balhae area. Because the Jurchens considered Hanpu to be the sixth-generation ancestor of Wanyan Wugunai (1021–1074), historians postulate that Hanpu lived in the early tenth century, when the Jurchens still consisted of independent tribes, or sometime between the founding of Goryeo in 918 and its destruction of Silla in 935.

The Wanyan clan then belonged to a group of Jurchen tribes that Chinese and Khitan documents called "wild", "raw", or "uncivilized" (shēng 生). These "wild Jurchens" lived between the Changbai Mountains in the south (now at the border between North Korea and Northeast China) and the Sungari River in the north, outside the territory of the rising Liao dynasty (907–1125) and little influenced by Chinese culture.

To resolve an endless cycle of vendettas between two clans, Hanpu managed to make both parties accept a new rule: from then on, the family of a killer would compensate the victim's relatives with a gift of horses, cattle, and money. Historian Herbert Franke has compared this aspect of Jurchen customary law to the old Germanic practice of Wergeld. As a reward for putting an end to the feuds, Hanpu was married to a sixty-year-old woman who then bore him one daughter and two sons. A lost book called the Shenlu Ji states that Hanpu's wife was 40 years old. Hanpu and his descendants were then formally received into the Wanyan clan.

== Hanpu's ethnicity ==
According to the Songmo Jiwen (松漠記聞), a 12th-century text by Hong Hao (1088-1155), a man from the Song dynasty who wrote it during his travels in the Jin dynasty, Hanpu was a man from Silla. The History of Jin, however, says that Hanpu was from Goryeo. Some take this to mean that Hanpu was a native of Silla or Goryeo while others believe he was a Jurchen living in those countries. Some Korean scholars support the idea that Hanpu was likely an ethnic Sillan from Goryeo that fled north towards Jurchen territories during the Later Three Kingdoms. However, Hanpu's ethnicity remains unclear and cannot be determined with precision. The annals of King Yejong (r. 1105–1122) in the History of Goryeo report that Wanyan Wugunai's son Yingge (盈歌; 1053–1103) considered Goryeo as his "parent country" (父母之邦) because his clan's ancestor Hanpu had come from Goryeo. When the Jin was founded, the Jurchens called Goryeo their "parent country" or "father and mother" country also because it had traditionally been part of their system of tributary relations, its rhetoric, advanced culture, as well as the idea that it was "bastard offspring of Koryŏ". However Wanyan Yingge initiated an invasion of the Korean peninsula and Yingge's paternal nephew Wanyan Wuyashu fought against the Koreans. The Jin also put pressure on Goryeo and demanded that Goryeo become their subject. While many in Goryeo were against this, Yi Cha-gyŏm was in power at the time and judged peaceful relations with the Jin to be beneficial to his own political power. He accepted the Jin demands and in 1126, the king of Goryeo declared himself a Jin vassal (tributary). However the Goryeo king retained his position as "Son of Heaven" within Goryeo. By incorporating Jurchen history into that of Goryeo and emphasizing the Jin emperors as bastard offspring of Goryeo, and placing the Jin within the template of a "northern dynasty", the imposition of Jin suzerainty became more acceptable.

Chinese scholars have debated the ethnicity of Hanpu. They usually agree that Hanpu's "coming from Goryeo" does not mean he was of Goryeo ethnicity, since Goryeo territory was populated by several ethnic groups back then. The people of the time did not always distinguish between state and ethnic group, so that in modern terms Hanpu may have been a Jurchen from the state of Silla, a man of Goryeo, or a Silla man. According to the Songmo Jiwen, Hanpu's surname was already Wanyan before he moved from Goryeo. Historian Sun Jinji has therefore argued that Hanpu was a Jurchen whose family had lived in Silla and then Goryeo before moving back to Jurchen land. Chinese historians Menggutuoli and Zhao Yongchun both argue that Hanpu's ancestors were Jurchens who had lived in Silla and had been absorbed into Goryeo after the latter defeated Silla. Furthermore, Zhao theorizes that Wanyan Yingge calling Goryeo his "parent country" may have been part of the Jurchens' diplomatic efforts to obtain Goryeo's help in fighting the Liao dynasty.

Western scholars usually consider Hanpu's story legendary. Herbert Franke explains that this Jurchen "ancestral legend" probably indicates that the Wanyan clan absorbed immigrants from Goryeo and Balhae sometime in the tenth century. Frederick W. Mote, who calls this account of the founding of the Wanyan clan a "tribal legend", claims that Hanpu's two brothers (one who stayed in Goryeo and one in Balhae) might have represented "the tribe's memory of their ancestral links to these two peoples." One Western historian of Jurchens has even proposed that Hanpu was not even from the Korean peninsula, instead what really happened was that a power on the peninsula ruled the Jurchen tribe he came from, or that he was from the Eastern Jurchens (Changbai Mountain Jurchens) who did not live in the Korean peninsula.

== Legacy ==
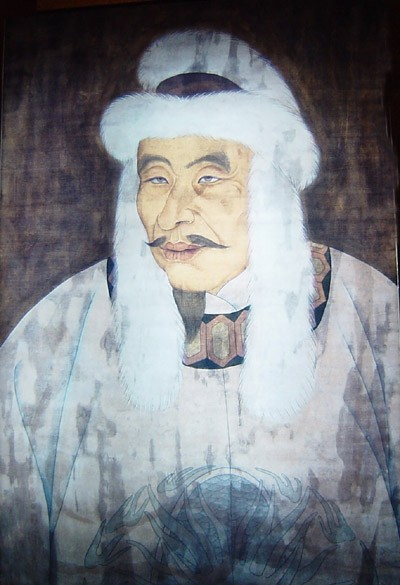
Aguda, eighth-generation descendant of Hanpu, founded the Jin dynasty in 1115

The Wanyan clan rose to prominence among the Jurchens after 1000 CE. Hanpu's sixth-generation descendant Wanyan Wugunai (1021–1074) started to consolidate the dispersed Jurchen tribes into a federation. Wugunai's grandson Aguda (1068–1123) defeated the Jurchens' Khitan overlords of the Liao dynasty and founded the Jin dynasty in 1115. By 1127, the Jin had conquered all of north China from the Song dynasty.

In 1136 or 1137, soon after Emperor Xizong of Jin (r. 1135–1150) had been crowned, Hanpu was given the posthumous name "Emperor Jingyuan" (景元皇帝) and the temple name "Shizu" (始祖), meaning "first ancestor." In 1144 or 1145, Hanpu's burial site was named "Guangling" (光陵). In December 1145 or January 1146, his posthumous title was augmented to that of "Emperor Yixian Jingyuan" (懿憲景元皇帝).

== Family members ==
Hanpu's wife posthumously received the title of Empress Mingyi 明懿皇后 in 1136. The History of Jin, an official history that was compiled by Mongol scholar Toqto'a in the 1340s, lists Hanpu's family members as follows:

Children:

- Wulu 烏魯 (eldest son and successor)
- Wolu 斡魯 (second son)
- Zhusiban 注思板 (daughter)

Siblings:

- Agunai 阿古廼 (elder brother, who is said to have liked Buddhism and to have stayed in Goryeo when Hanpu left)
- Baohuoli 保活里 (younger brother)
