= Shilu (Jurchen) =

Chieftain of the Jurchen Wanyan tribe

- Born: Unknown
- Died: Unknown
- Spouse: Lady Tushan; Dahumo concubine
- Issue: Wugunai; Wuguchu; Bahei; Pulihei; Woli'an; Hushida
Posthumous name
- Emperor Wuhui Chengxiang (武惠成襄皇帝)
Temple name
- Zhaozu (昭祖)
- Father: Suike
- Mother: Empress Gongjing

Shilu
- Traditional Chinese: 石魯
- Simplified Chinese: 石鲁
Transcriptions
Standard Mandarin
- Hanyu Pinyin: Shílǔ
- Wade–Giles: Shih-lu

Shilu was a chieftain of the Wanyan tribe, the most dominant among the Jurchen tribes which later founded the Jin dynasty (1115–1234). He was the eldest son of Suike. He was appointed chieftain of the Wanyan tribe by the Khitan-led Liao dynasty, which ruled northern China between the 10th and 11th centuries.

Shilu was posthumously honoured with the temple name Zhaozu (昭祖) by his descendant, Emperor Xizong.

== Family ==
- Father: Suike
- Mother: Suike's primary consort, posthumously honoured as Empress Gongjing (恭靖皇后)
- Spouse: Lady Tushan (徒單氏), posthumously honoured as Empress Weishun (威順皇后), bore Wugunai and Wuguchu
- Concubines:
  - Dahumo (達胡末) of the Wusazha (烏薩扎) tribe, bore Bahei, Pulihei and Woli'an
  - Concubine of unknown name, from Goryeo, bore Hushida
- Sons:
  - Wugunai, posthumously honoured as Emperor Jingzu
  - Wuguchu (烏古出)
  - Bahei (跋黑)
  - Pulihei (仆里黑)
  - Woli'an (斡里安)
  - Hushida (胡失答)
