= Wuyashu =

Chieftain of the Jurchen Wanyan tribe

- Born: c. 1061
- Died: 1113 (aged 51–52)
Posthumous name
- Emperor Xianmin Gongjian (獻敏恭簡皇帝)
Temple name
- Kangzong (康宗)
- Father: Helibo
- Mother: Lady Nalan

Wuyashu
- Traditional Chinese: 烏雅束
- Simplified Chinese: 乌雅束
Transcriptions
Standard Mandarin
- Hanyu Pinyin: Wūyǎshù

Wuyashu (c. 1061–1113) was a chieftain of the Wanyan tribe, the most dominant among the Jurchen tribes which later founded the Jin dynasty (1115–1234). He was the eldest son of Helibo and the elder brother of Aguda (Emperor Taizu), the founder and first emperor of the Jin dynasty. He was posthumously honoured with the temple name Kangzong.

== Life ==
Wuyashu was born to the Jurchen chieftain Helibo in 1061. He inherited the leadership position of the Wanyan tribe from his uncle, Yingge (盈歌), in 1104. Yingge died during the conquest of Helandian (曷懶甸; present-day Hamgyong Province, North Korea) after pacifying the Tumen River basin. Wuyashu resumed the project in the next year. Under his order, Shishihuan (石適歡) led a Wanyan army from the Tumen River basin to subdue rival Jurchen tribes in Helandian and advance southward to chase about 1,800 remnants who defected to the Korean kingdom Goryeo. Goryeo did not hand them over but sent Im Kan (林幹) to intercept the Wanyan army. However, Shishihuan defeated Im Kan north of the Chŏngp'ŏyng wall and invaded northeastern frontier of Goryeo. Goryeo dispatched Yun Kwan to resist the Jurchens but lost in battle again. As a result, Wuyashu subjugated the Jurchens in Helandian.

In 1107, Goryeo sent a delegate, Heihuanfangshi (黑歡方石), to celebrate Wuyashu's accession to the chieftainship of the Wanyan tribe, and promised to return those Helandian Jurchens who escaped to Goryeo. However, when Wuyashu's delegates, Aguo (阿聒) and Wulinda Shengkun (烏林答勝昆), arrived in Goryeo, the Koreans killed them and dispatched five large armies led by Yun Kwan to attack Helandian. The Goryeo army destroyed a hundred Jurchen villages and built nine fortresses there. Wuyashu thought about giving up Helandian, but his brother Aguda convinced him to dispatch Wosai (斡賽), another of their brothers, to fight Goryeo. Wosai also built nine fortresses facing Goryeo's nine fortresses. After a one-year battle, the Wanyan army won two fortresses but they suffered heavy losses and seven other fortresses were still held by the Goryeo forces. Jurchens offered a truce to Goryeo and Goryeo and the Jurchens achieved a settlement. As a result, Jurchens swore not to invade Goryeo and Goryeo withdrew from the nine fortresses.

Wuyashu also pacified the Suifen River basin. He was succeeded by his younger brother, Aguda, when he died in 1113.

== Family ==
Parents

- Father: Helibo (1039—1092), Emperor Shenwu Shengsu (神武聖肅皇帝)
- Mother: Empress Yijian (翼簡皇后) of the Nalan clan (拏懶氏)

Consorts and their respective issue(s):

- Empress Jingxi, of the Tangkuo clan (敬僖皇后 唐括氏)
  - Wanyan Zongxiong, Prince of Chu (楚王 完顏宗雄), first son
- Concubine, of the Wenduo clan (妾溫都氏)
  - Wanyan Tonqiaozhuo, General Zhaowu (昭武大將軍 完顏同喬茁)
- Concubine, of the Pusan clan (妾僕散氏)
  - Wanyan Kuma, Duke of Zong (宗國公 完顏隈可)
