= Wugunai =

Chinese chieftain

- Born: c. 1021
- Died: 1074 (aged 52–53)
- Spouse: Lady Tangkuo; Zhusihui; Lady Wendihen
- Issue: Hezhe; Helibo; Hesun; Pocishu; Yingge; Hezhenbao; Mapo; Alihemen; Manduhe
Posthumous name
- Emperor Yinglie Huihuan (英烈惠桓皇帝)
Temple name
- Jingzu (景祖)
- Father: Shilu
- Mother: Lady Tushan

Wugunai
- Traditional Chinese: 烏骨廼
- Simplified Chinese: 乌骨迺
Transcriptions
Standard Mandarin
- Hanyu Pinyin: Wūgúnǎi
- Wade–Giles: Wu-ku-nai

Wugunai (c. 1021–1074) was a chieftain of the Wanyan tribe, the most dominant among the Jurchen tribes which later founded the Jin dynasty (1115–1234). He was the eldest son of Shilu. Like his father, Wugunai was appointed chieftain of the Wanyan tribe by the Khitan-led Liao dynasty, which ruled northern China between the 10th and 11th centuries. Historical sources describe Wugunai as a brave warrior, great eater and hard drinker, and a lover of women.

Wugunai was posthumously honoured with the temple name Jingzu (景祖) by his descendant, Emperor Xizong.

== Family ==
- Father: Shilu
- Mother: Lady Tushan (徒單氏), posthumously honoured as Empress Weishun (威順皇后)
- Spouse: Lady Tangkuo (唐括氏), posthumously honoured as Empress Zhaosu (昭肅皇后), bore Hezhe, Helibo, Hesun, Pocishu and Yingge
- Concubines:
  - Zhusihui (注思灰), of Khitan descent, bore Hezhenbao
  - Lady Wendihen (溫迪痕氏), personal name Diben (敵本), bore Mapo, Alihemen and Manduke
- Sons:
  - Hezhe (劾者), Duke of Han (韓國公)
  - Helibo, posthumously honoured as Emperor Shizu
  - Hesun (劾孫), Duke of Yi (沂國公)
  - Pocishu (頗刺淑), posthumously honoured as Emperor Suzong (肅宗)
  - Yingge (盈歌), posthumously honoured as Emperor Muzong (穆宗)
  - Hezhenbao (劾真保), Duke of Dai (代國公)
  - Mapo (麻頗), Duke of Yu (虞國公)
  - Alihemen (阿離合懣), Duke of Sui (隋國公)
  - Manduhe (謾都訶), Duke of Zheng (鄭國公)
