= Wanyan =

Clan of the Heishui Mohe tribe

- Country: Jin Empire
- Founded: 1115
- Founder: Wanyan Aguda
- Final ruler: Wanyan Chenglin
- Titles: Emperor of the Jin Empire
- Estates: Palaces in Huining Prefecture and Zhongdu
- Deposition: 1234

Wanyan

Manchu name
- Manchu script: ᠸᠠᠩᡤᡳᠶᠠᠨ

Chinese name
- Traditional Chinese: 完顏氏
- Simplified Chinese: 完颜氏
Transcriptions
Standard Mandarin
- Hanyu Pinyin: wán yán shì

Jurchen name
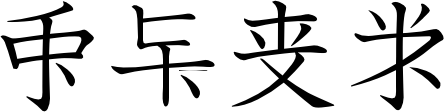
- Jurchen

The Wanyan alternatively rendered as Wanggiya, was a clan of the Heishui Mohe tribe living in the drainage region of the Heilong River during the time of the Khitan-led Liao dynasty. Of the Heishui Mohe, the clan was counted by the Liao dynasty among the "uncivilized Jurchens" (生女真), indicating that the clan was not subject to the direct rule of the Liao emperors. Those Heishui Mohe clans ruled by the Liao dynasty were referred to as "civilized Jurchens" (熟女真). The Wanyan clan later founded the Jin dynasty.

== Etymology ==
The Wanyan surname for the Jurchen imperial family is found in numerous languages in different forms such as Wongian, Wonyan, Wongyan, or Ongging. In the Manchu language, it is rendered Wanggiyan. The name does not originate from Jurchen but from a Sino-Khitan word combining the Middle Chinese title for king or prince (ong; wang in modern Mandarin Chinese) and a Khitan suffix. The name was written as 完颜 during the Liao-Jin period, resulting in the modern Mandarin pronunciation as Wányán. The Wanyan Jurchens therefore means the "kingly" or "royal" Jurchens.

== Origins ==
There is no dated evidence of the Jurchens before the time of Wugunai (1021-74), when the Jurchens began to coalesce into a nation-like federation. According to tradition passed down via oral transmission, Wugunai was the 6th generation descendant of Hanpu, the founder of the Wanyan clan, who therefore must have lived around the year 900. Hanpu originally came from the Heishui Mohe tribe of Balhae. According to the History of Jin, when he came to the Wanyan tribe, it was for the repayment of a murder and a form of compensation. He had two brothers, one who stayed in Goryeo and the other in Balhae when he left. By the time he arrived and settled among the Wanyan, he was already 60 years old and accepted as a "wise man". He succeeded in settling a dispute between two families without resorting to violence, and as a reward, was betrothed to a worthy unmarried maiden also 60 years old. The marriage was blessed with the gift of a dark ox, which was revered in Jurchen culture, and from this union came one daughter and three sons. With this, Hanpu became the chief of the Wanyan and his descendants became formal members of the Wanyan clan.

Because Hanpu arrived from Goryeo, some South Korean scholars have claimed that Hanpu hailed from Goryeo. According to Alexander Kim, this cannot be easily identified as him being Korean because many Balhae people lived in Goryeo at that time. Later when Aguda appealed to the Balhae people in the Liao dynasty for support by emphasizing their common origin, he only mentioned those who descended from the "seven Wuji tribes", which the Goguryeo people were not a part of. It seems by that point, the Jurchens saw only the Mohe tribes as a related people. Some western scholars consider the origin of Hanpu to be legendary in nature. Herbert Franke described the narrative provided in the History of Jin as an "ancestral legend" with a historical basis in that the Wanyan clan had absorbed immigrants from Goryeo and Balhae during the 10th century. Frederick W. Mote described it as a "tribal legend" that may have born the tribe's memories. The two brothers remaining in Goryeo and Balhae may represent ancestral ties to those two peoples while Hanpu's marriage may represent the tribe's transformation from a matrilineal to patrilineal society.

== Rise ==
Wanyan Yingge initiated an invasion of the Korean peninsula and Yingge's paternal nephew Wanyan Wuyashu fought against the Koreans, forcing them to submit and recognize Jurchens as overlords after "pacifying" the border between the Koreans and Jurchens. Yingge died during the conquest of Helandian (曷懶甸; present-day Hamgyong Province, North Korea) after pacifying the Tumen River basin. Wuyashu resumed the project in the next year. Under his order, Shishihuan (石適歡) led a Wanyan army from the Tumen River basin to subdue rival Jurchen tribes in Helandian and advance southward to chase about 1,800 remnants who defected to the Korean kingdom Goryeo. Goryeo did not hand them over but sent Im Gan (林幹) to intercept the Wanyan army. However, Shishihuan defeated Im Gan north of the Chŏngp'ŏyng wall and invaded northeastern frontier of Goryeo. Goryeo dispatched Yun Kwan to resist the Jurchens but lost in battle again. As a result, Wuyashu subjugated the Jurchens in Helandian.

In 1107, Goryeo sent a delegate, Heihuanfangshi (黑歡方石), to celebrate Wuyashu's accession to the chieftainship of the Wanyan tribe, and promised to return those Helandian Jurchens who escaped to Goryeo. However, when Wuyashu's delegates, Aguo (阿聒) and Wulinda Shengkun (烏林答勝昆), arrived in Goryeo, the Koreans killed them and dispatched five large armies led by Yun Kwan to attack Helandian. The Goryeo army destroyed a hundred Jurchen villages and built nine fortresses there. Wuyashu thought about giving up Helandian, but his brother Aguda convinced him to dispatch Wosai (斡賽), another of their brothers, to fight Goryeo. Wosai also built nine fortresses facing Goryeo's nine fortresses. After a one-year battle, the Wanyan army won two fortresses but they suffered heavy losses and seven other fortresses were still held by the Goryeo forces. Jurchens offered a truce to Goryeo and Goryeo and the Jurchens achieved a settlement. As a result, Jurchens swore not to invade Goryeo and Goryeo withdrew from the nine fortresses.

Wuyashu also pacified the Suifen River basin.

== Founding of the Jurchen-led Jin dynasty ==
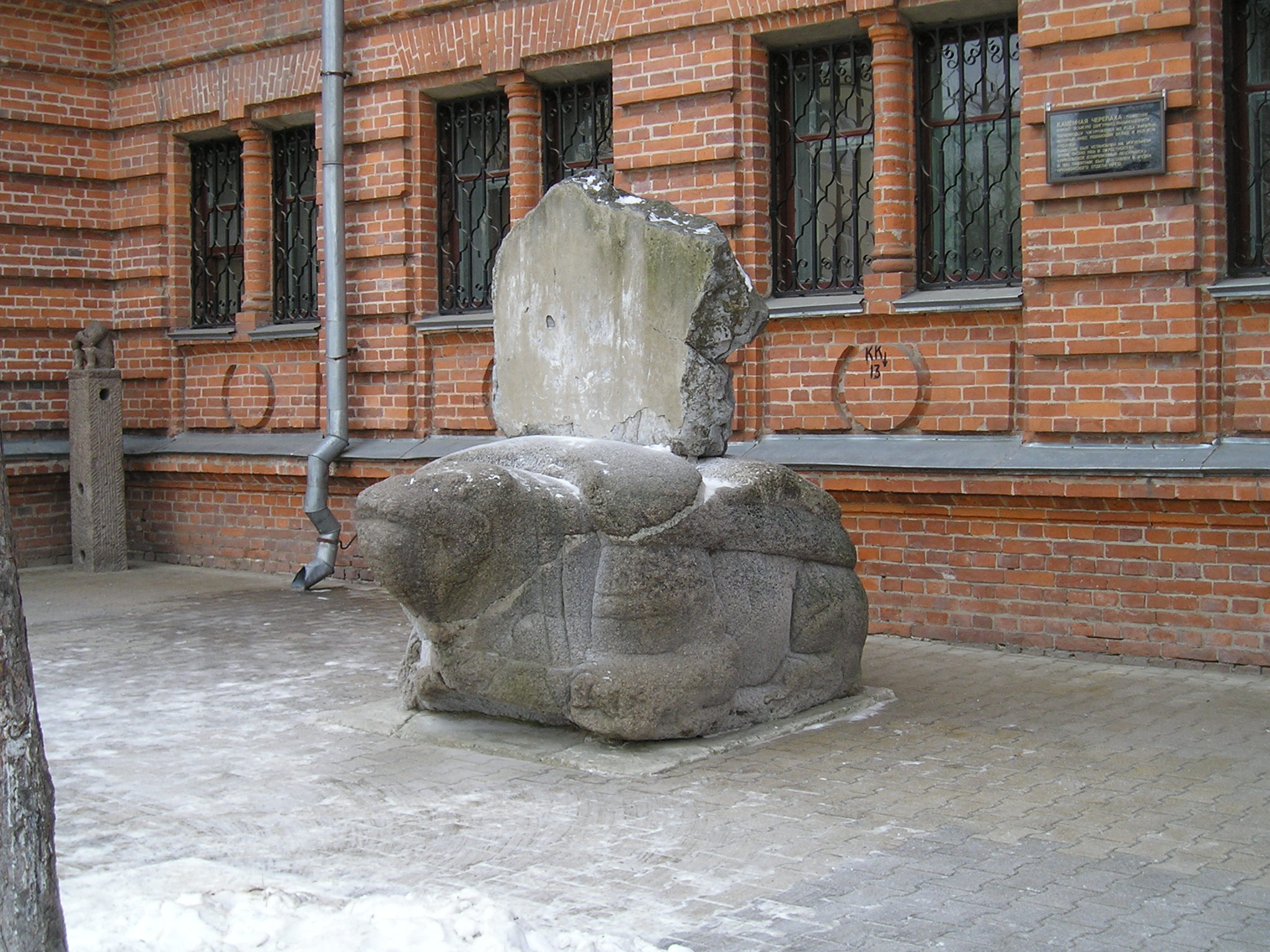
A bixi stone originally erected on the grave of Wanyan Asikui (完顏阿思魁, ?-1136), one of Aguda's generals, near modern-day Ussuriysk in 1193. The monument is now exhibited in Khabarovsk Regional Museum.

In 1115 AD, Wanyan Aguda, the chieftain of the Wanyan clan at the time, founded the Jin dynasty. Before his death in 1123, he also ended the Liao dynasty. Two years later, his brother Wanyan Wuqimai invaded the Song dynasty and conquered northern China in the Jin–Song Wars. Thereafter the Jurchens became sinicized; this can be seen in the sinicization of the surname "Wanyan" to "Wang" in the official Jurchen historical records.

== Downfall and in the modern day ==
The Jin dynasty was destroyed in 1234 AD. After their victory, Mongol declared that people with the surname "Wanyan" were considered to be related to the royal line of the Jin dynasty, and therefore such individuals were to be executed immediately. For the sake of survival, those people with the surname "Wanyan" either changed the name to Wang or moved to a remote area to avoid capture and execution and used the Manchu format Wanggiyan. Some Qing-era Manchu aristocrats held the surname Wanyan and claimed to be descendants of the Jin imperial family. In present-day China, few descendants have kept the surname "Wanyan."

== Notable figures ==
=== Males ===
- Aguda 1115–1123, Emperor Taizu of Jin, founder of Jin dynasty
- Wuqimai 1123–1135, Emperor Taizong of Jin
- Dan 1135–1149, Emperor Xizong of Jin
- Liang 1149–1161, fourth emperor of the Jurchen-led Jin dynasty
- Yong 1161–1189, Emperor Shizong of Jin
- Jing 1189–1208, Emperor Zhangzong of Jin
- Yungong, Emperor Shizong's second son and heir apparent
- Xun 1213–1224, Emperor Xuanzong of Jin
- Shouxu 1224–1234, Emperor Aizong of Jin
- Chenglin 1234, Emperor Mo of Jin
- Xongbi, military general and civil minister of the Jurchen-led Jin dynasty, also known as Wushu
- Yongji
- Heda
- Chenheshang
- Zhanhan
- Hafeng'a (哈丰阿), held a title of master commandant of light chariot (轻车都尉, pinyin: qingcheduwei)
- Qing'en (庆恩), served as sixth rank literary official

Prince Consort

Date	Prince Consort	Princess
1609	Chuoheluo (綽和絡)	Šurhaci's seventh daughter (b. 1597) by secondary consort (Gūwalgiya)
1943	Ailan (愛蘭; 1921–2005)	Zaifeng's sixth daughter (Yunyu; 1919–1982) by secondary consort (Denggiya)

=== Females ===
Imperial Consort

- Consort
  - Consort Shu (b. 1772), the Jiaqing Emperor's secondary consort
  - Consort Zhuang (1781–1811), the Jiaqing Emperor's consort
- Imperial Concubine
  - Imperial Concubine Jing, the Kangxi Emperor's imperial concubine

Princess Consort

- Primary Consort
  - Yunti's primary consort, the mother of Hongming (1705–1767) and Hongkai (1707–1759)
- Secondary Consort
  - Yunreng's secondary consort, the mother of Hongtiao (1714–1774) and Hongbing (1720–1763)
  - Yongzhang's secondary consort, the mother of first son (1756)
  - Yongcheng's secondary consort, the mother of Mianhui (1764–1796), second son (1766), third son (1767–1769), Princess (1769–1787), fourth son (1771) and Princess (b. 1776)
  - Yicong's secondary consort, the mother of Zaijin (1859–1896)
- Concubine
  - Yunzhi's concubine, the mother of Hongyi (1715–1754)
  - Yuntang's concubine, the mother of first daughter (1701–1725), Lady (1704–1727) and Hongding (1711–1782)

== See also ==
- Category:Wanyan family – Wanyan family members (in Chinese)
- List of Manchu clans
- Plain White Banner

== Bibliography ==
- Atwood, Christopher P. (2021), The Rise of the Mongols: Five Chinese Sources, Hackett Publishing Company, Incorporated
- Franke, Herbert (1981), "Jurchen Customary Law and the Chinese Law of the Chin Dynasty", in Dieter Eikemeier; Herbert Franke (eds.), State and Law in East Asia: Festschrift Karl Bünger, Wiesbaden: Harrassowitz, pp. 215–233, ISBN 3-447-02164-0.
- —— (1990), "The forest peoples of Manchuria: Kitans and Jurchens", in Denis Sinor (ed.), Cambridge History of Early Inner Asia, Cambridge: Cambridge University Press, pp. 400–423, ISBN 0-521-24304-1.
- —— (1994), "The Chin Dynasty", in Herbert Franke and Denis Twitchett (ed.), Cambridge History of China, vol. 6, Alien regimes and border states, 907–1368, Cambridge: Cambridge University Press, pp. 215–320, ISBN 978-0-521-24331-5.
- Kim, Alexander (2011b), On the Origin of the Jurchen People (A Study Based on Russian Sources)
- Mote, Frederick W. (1999), Imperial China (900–1800), Cambridge, MA: Harvard University Press, ISBN 0-674-44515-5.
