= Military of the Jin dynasty (1115–1234) =

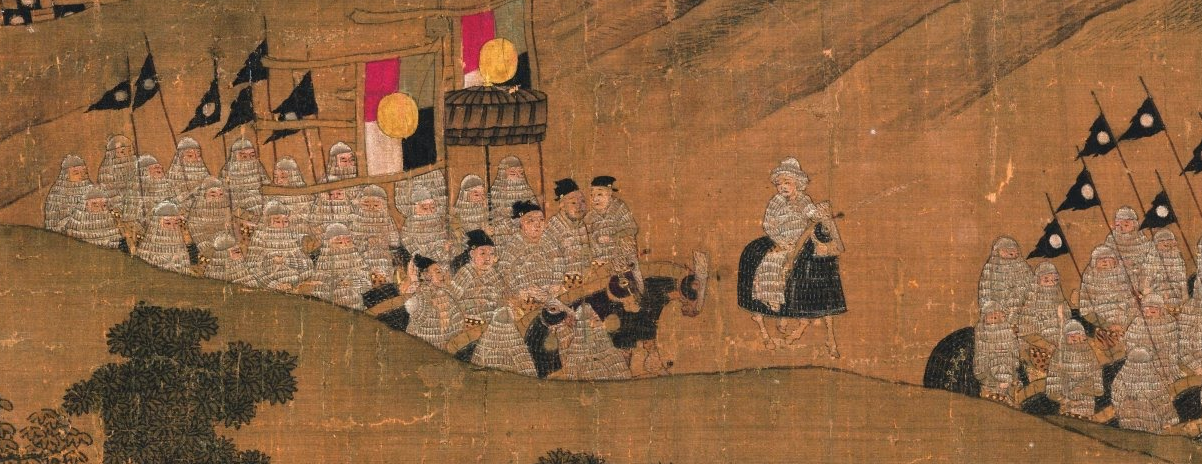
Cataphracts with Jin dynasty (Jurchen) flags. Ruiyingtu (瑞應圖, Illustrations of Auspicious Omens), Song dynasty painting.

The military of the Jin dynasty (Chinese: 金朝; pinyin: Jīn cháo), officially known as the Great Jin (大金; Dà Jīn), was the military force of an imperial dynasty of China, founded by rulers of Jurchen origin, that ruled over northern China between 1115 and 1234.

In Empire of The Steppes, René Grousset reports that the Mongols were always amazed at the valour of the Jurchen warriors, who held out until seven years after the death of Genghis Khan. The Jin dynasty's standing forces numbered at approximately half a million, the largest in the world at the time, circa 1195. In the view of some scholars such as H. D. Martin, they were also the most powerful force at the time.

== Organisation structure ==
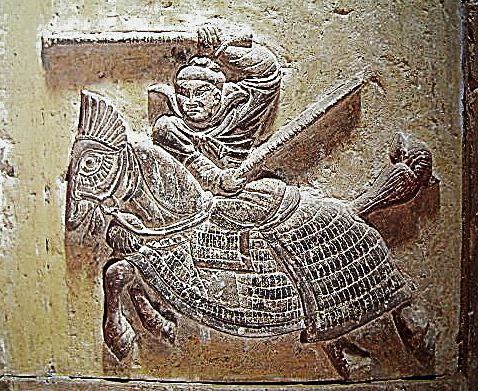
Jin cavalry

In the early years of the Jin, when the Song had tried to reclaim the Sixteen Prefectures from the Liao dynasty, they had faced fierce resistance from the Han Chinese population, yet when the Jin invaded that area, local Han Chinese did not oppose them at all. The Jin easily took Yanjing, where the Song general Guo Yaoshi (郭藥師), who was formerly a Liao governor, now switched his allegiance to the Jin. As Jin forces pushed further south, former Song territory was placed under the control of the Jin's puppet State of Qi government, which instituted military conscription. It was hence responsible for supplying a large portion of the troops that fought the Song in the seven years following the dynasty's creation. The Qi were obligated to obey the orders of the Jurchen generals. With Jin support, Qi invaded the Song in November 1133. Li Cheng, a Song turncoat who had joined the Qi, led the campaign. Xiangyang and nearby prefectures fell to his army. The capture of Xiangyang on the Han River gave the Jurchens a passage into the central valley of the Yangtze River, but were defeated by the Song forces of Yue Fei. Emperor Xizong (r. 1135–1150) and his generals were disappointed with Liu Yu's military failures and believed that Liu was secretly conspiring with Yue Fei's counteroffensive. In late 1137, the Jin abolished the state of Qi.

=== Meng'an Mouke system ===
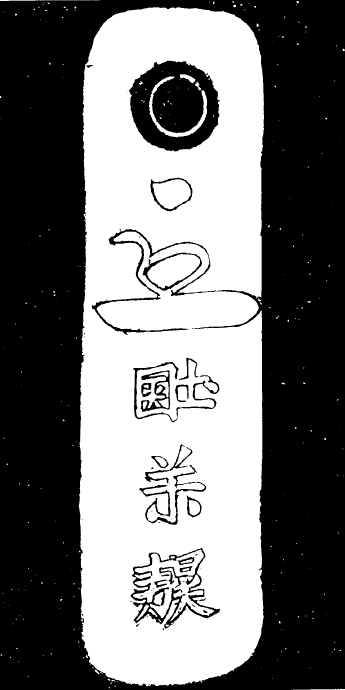
Jin silver plaque of authority for a mouke in large Jurchen script written in blocks in the style of small Jurchen script; the inscription reads "Trust of the Country".

The Jin military was organised through the meng-an mou-k'o (meng'an mouke) system, seemingly similar to the later Eight Banners of the Qing dynasty. Meng-an is from the Mongol word for thousand, mingghan (see Military of the Yuan dynasty) while mou-k'o means clan or tribe. Groups of fifty households known as p'u-li-yen were grouped together as a mou-k'o, while seven to ten mou-k'o formed a meng-an, and several meng-an were grouped into a wanhu, Chinese for Ten Thousand Households. This was not only a military structure but also grouped all Jurchen households for economic and administrative functions. Khitans and Han Chinese soldiers who had defected to the Jin dynasty were also assigned into their own meng-an. All male members of the households were required to serve in the military; the servants of the household would serve as auxiliaries to escort their masters in battle. The numbers of Han Chinese soldiers in the Jin's armies seemed to be very significant. The mouke included not only a mixture of households, but also their slaves and livestock, operating as a self-sufficient economic-military body, similar to a warband. Although mouke technically meant clan, their members were not necessarily related by blood; the word denoted a hunting or herding group, and was formed for administrative purposes. Their offices were hereditary, and their internal hierarchy or numbers was not fixed.

The mouke system represented the emperors' attempt to stretch the concept of the nomadic "warband" to incorporate all subject peoples without losing the close intimacy of ties within the group. The Jin emperor also possessed his own mouke, which functioned as his own imperial guards.

Before declaring the formation of the Jin and claiming the title of emperor, the Jurchen ruler used the title of Dubojilie (都勃极列, the head of a tribal alliance, from Jurchen du meaning “head”), and Bojilie, the title of ordinary tribal chiefs. The ruler's assistant was the Anbanbojilie (amban, Jurchen for minister), while the chief minister was a Guolunbojilie (from gurun, Jurchen for state), and the title of an army commander was Hulubojilie (忽魯勃極列, from Jurchen gurun begile). When the population was mobilized for war, the Bojilie took on military command of the meng-an, which was the name of both the military unit and the title of its commander. The leadership of the dynasty was directed by the Council of Great Chieftains (Bojilie) until 1134 when Wuqimai dismantled it. Mouke was also the title of the commander of a mouke unit. Temujin (Genghis Khan) was also given this title mouke when he was still a tributary of the Jin, and the system inspired his own military system.

The headships of the meng-an were initially the economic source of the Jurchen aristocracy's power; some of the meng-an became private armies of hereditary imperial princes, seizing properties and challenging the throne. Jurchen military commanders were largely hereditary Jurchen nobles, and were given power over the local civilian governors where they were garrisoned. Prince Hailing abolished these autonomous positions, brutally suppressing potential threats, and thus established a more centralized Chinese-style model. The mouke system helped to maintain walled compounds of horse herds to ensure a steady supply of horses for the cavalrymen and their armour-bearers.

Ethnic Bohai were an important element of not only civil but military administration in the Jin dynasty from its earliest stages. After annexing the Bohai rebel regime of Gao Yongchang, the Jin moved to attract Bohai recruits by sending out two Bohai, Liang Fu (梁福) and Wodala (斡荅剌) to encourage their compatriots to join the Jin, using the slogan "Jurchen and Bohai are originally of the same family" (女真渤海本同一家). Da Gao (大㚖), a descendant of Bohai royalty, was a major military commander in the Jin, commanding eight meng-an of Bohai troops, and excelled in battle against the Song army. The Bohai were admired for their martial skills: "full of cunning, surpassing other nations in courage." Bohai likely had a system of organisation similar to the meng'an mouke as early as 926, when they fled the destruction of their state in groups of 100, 300 and 500 households.

In 1140, sedentary populations such as the Han and Bohai were discharged from the meng-an system, and in 1163 the Khitans were discharged due to rebellion, although the Khitans who remained loyal were declared exempted from removal a few months later.

=== "Filial and Loyal Troops" ===
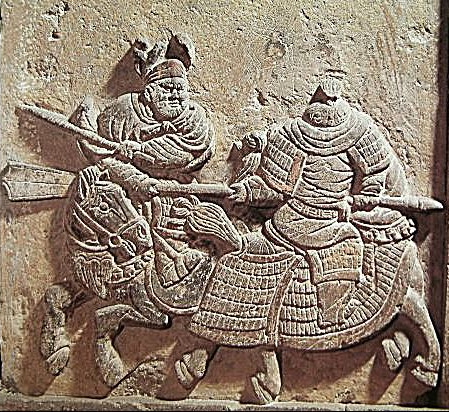
Jin cavalry

After the meng-an forces declined in effectiveness, ad hoc Chinese irregulars called Zhongxiao Jun (filial and loyal troops) were raised to fight the Mongols. They were known for their courage but also ill-discipline. The Zhongxiao Jun also included Uyghur, Tuyuhun, Qiang and Naiman troops, who were defectors and captives enlisting with the Jin forces. There were even Qipchaqs from the European steppe who joined this force. The Zhongxiao Jun were mounted and selected based on mounted archery skills, and paid three times more than the ordinary troops to encourage more enemy soldiers to defect. The imperial court also defended their ill-disciplined behaviour and high crime rate by saying that foreign defectors were rare and needed to be "treated magnanimously". The Zhongxiao Jun came directly under the Bureau of Military Affairs. Elite units called the "Red Coats" formed the vanguard of any assault much like the Mongol Ba'atur units, while other less elite units under the Bureau of Military Affairs, the "Red Jackets" (the same name previously used to refer to rebels in the Shandong region), supported the vanguard.

=== Cavalry ===
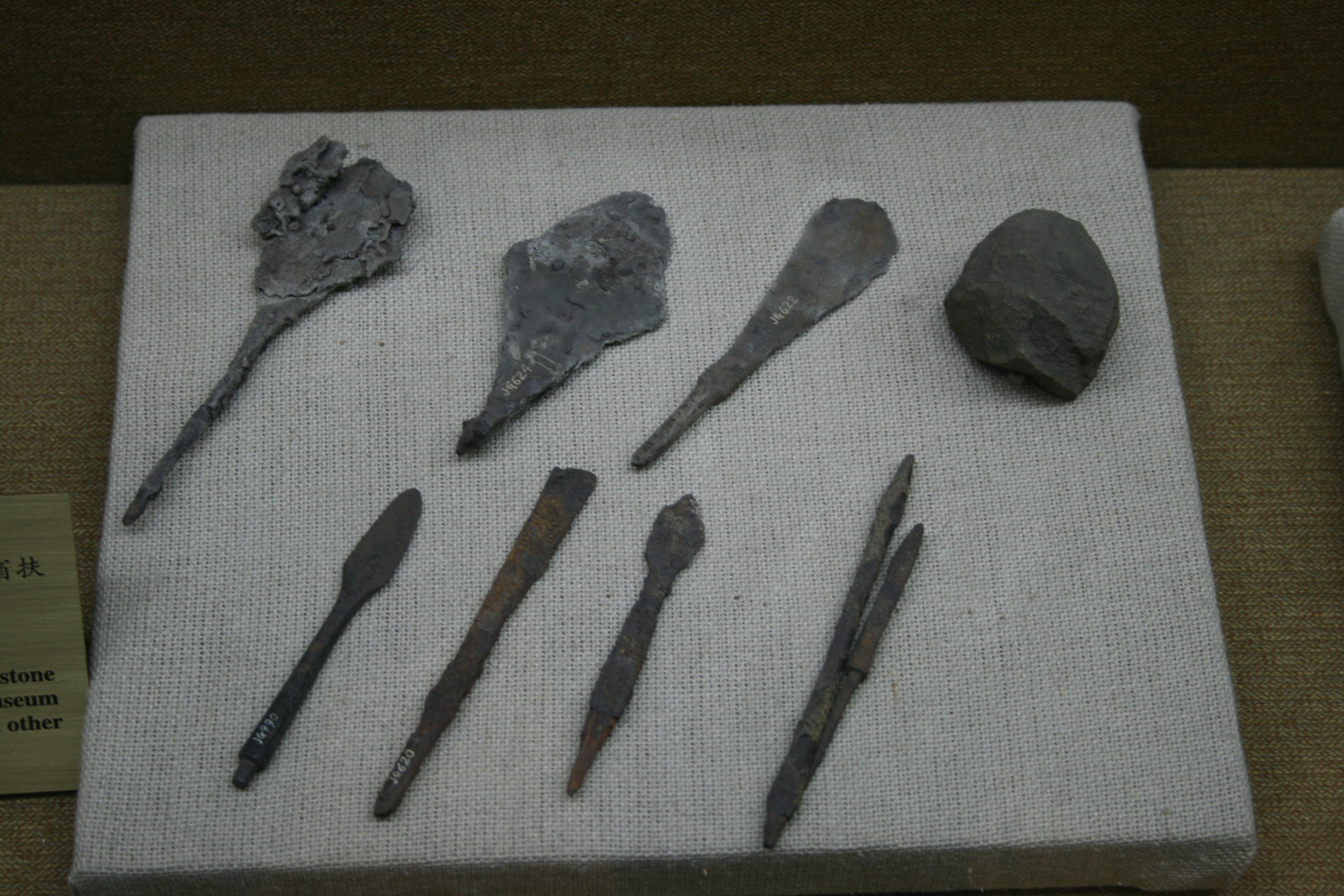
Jin arrowheads

Contemporary Chinese writers ascribed Jurchen success in overwhelming the Liao and Northern Song dynasties mainly to their cavalry. Already during Aguda's rebellion against the Liao dynasty, all Jurchen fighters were mounted. It was said that the Jurchen cavalry tactics were a carryover from their hunting skills. Jurchen horsemen were provided with heavy armor; on occasions, they would allegedly use a team of horses attached to each other with chains (Guaizi Ma), however this may have been a mistranslation of the Jurchen cavalry fighting in a dense formation. The armoured cavalry of the Jin dynasty were known as tiefutu or "Iron Pagodas," reflecting their extensive armour.

Their cavalry was arranged with two ranks of armoured heavy cavalry in front and three ranks of light cavalry behind. The Jurchen cavalry all carried composite bows which they showed great skill in using; Wanyan Aguda was famed for hitting a target at 320 paces. The armoured heavy cavalry were also equipped with lances and halberds, while the light cavalry provided archery support from behind. This arrangement was the reverse of the Khitans, who placed light horse archers in front as a screen for the heavy cavalry.

In its initial years, the Jin dynasty's armies contained 70 to 90% cavalry. Although the Jurchen were avid horse breeders who owned normal-sized horses, they used small horses for warfare. These small horses, like Yakutian and Mongolian horse breeds, were adapted to temperatures ranging from 40 degrees Celsius to negative 60 degrees Celsius, making them suited to military campaigns in central China during autumn and winter, as well as on the Mongolian steppe. Each Jurchen horseman joined the campaign with two horses, one for battle and one for transport. Each horseman was accompanied by a relative who served as his ališi (armour-bearer), who also brought two horses, one for riding and one to carry baggage. The Jin's Southern Song enemy Hua Yue commented that the Jin pastures in Henan and the northern marches were at least double that of the Song's, which moreover were also too far from the war front. Hence, the Song's horse supply was only 20 to 30% of the Jin's. This disparity constituted a major factor in the Jin's military advantage over the Song.

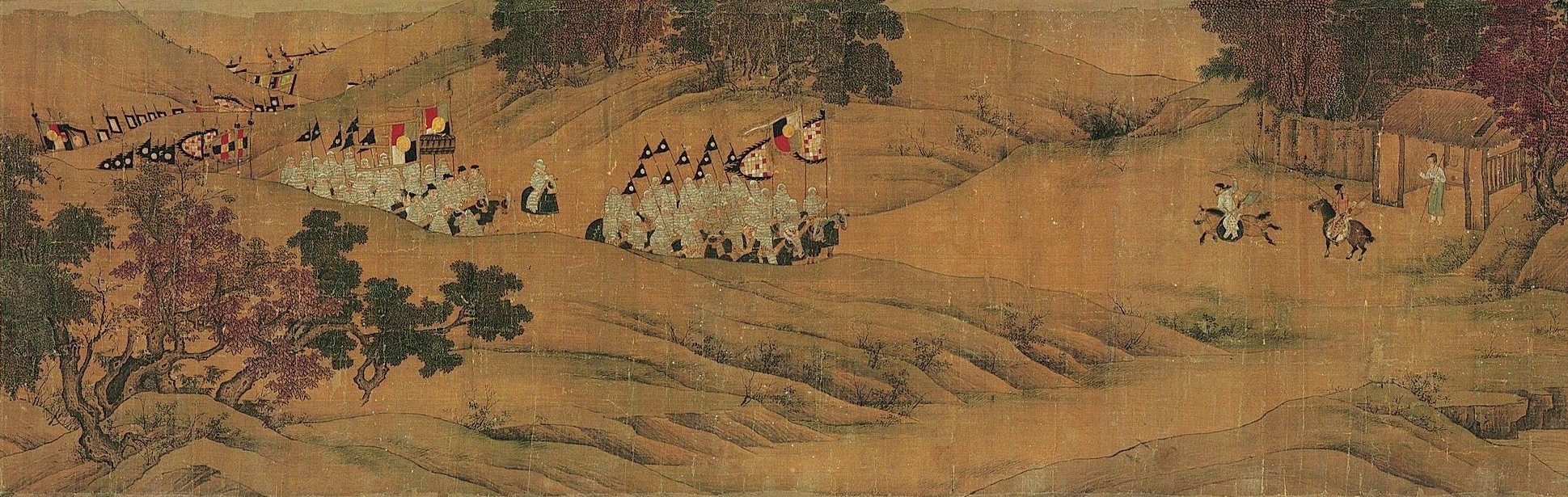
Jurchen "iron pagoda" cavalry from the scroll painting Ruiyingtu, Song dynasty

== Military technology ==
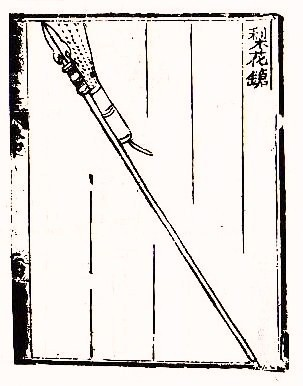
A fire lance as depicted in the Huolongjing, late 14th century (c. 1360-1375).

Jin troops regularly used gunpowder throughout the 13th century. As the Liao dynasty fell apart and the Song dynasty retreated beyond the Yangtze, the army of the new Jin dynasty absorbed many soldiers who formerly fought for the Liao or Song dynasties. The new Jin empire adopted many of the Song military's weapons, including various machines for siege warfare and artillery. In fact, the Jin military's use of cannons, grenades, and even rockets to defend besieged Kaifeng against the Mongols in 1233 is considered the first ever battle in human history in which gunpowder was used effectively, even though it failed to prevent the eventual Jin defeat. While earlier bombs were made of bamboo tubes filled with gunpowder, the Jin army in the 1221 siege of Qizhou began to use a bomb with a metal casing of cast iron that could pierce iron armour. This zhen tian lei (heaven-shaking thunder) was a genuine fragmentation bomb that could be launched from trebuchets or lowered by chains onto besiegers, and would be used against the Mongols at the siege of Kaifeng, later being adopted by the Southern Song and by the Mongols in their invasions of Japan. Before shooting gunpowder bombs, Jin forces first assessed range and direction with solid stone balls, followed by the actual gunpowder bombs when the shot landed accurately. This practice saved valuable ammunition. A contemporaneous record of the Kaifeng siege recounts the process by which the bombs were launched. First, a soldier ignited the fuse. The rope of the trebuchet was pulled, launching the bomb into the air. The bomb produced a large explosion the moment it landed, inflicting damage that could penetrate armor. The explosion sometimes sparked a fire on the grass of the battlefield, which could burn a soldier to death, even if he survived the initial blast.

The Jin also saw the introduction of a new, improved form of fire lance, the "flying" fire lance, that seemed to be more effective than earlier versions, with a tube that was still usable after firing and a range of 10 feet. While they were dismissive of most Jin weapons, the Mongols feared the "flying" fire lance and the heaven-shaking thunder bomb. The tube contained, besides the gunpowder ingredients of sulfur, charcoal, and saltpeter, ground porcelain and iron filings. The heated tinder that ignited the weapon was stored in a small iron box toted by the Jin soldiers in battle. Once the gunpowder was consumed, the fire lance could be wielded like a normal spear, or replenished by a new tube filled with gunpowder.

Illustrations and descriptions in the 14th century Chinese military treatise Huolongjing confirm that the Jin in 1232 used a primitive solid-propellant rocket then known as "fire arrows" to drive back the Mongols during the Siege of Kaifeng (1232). Each arrow took a form of a simple, solid-propellant rocket tube that was filled with gunpowder. One open end allowed the gas to escape and was attached to a long stick that acted as a guidance system for flight direction control.

A form of counterweight trebuchet may have been used in 1232 by the Jin commander Qiang Shen. Qiang invented a device called the "Arresting Trebuchet" which only needed a few men to work it, and could hurl great stones more than a hundred paces, further than even the strongest traction trebuchet. However no other details on the machine are given. Qiang died the following year and no further references to the Arresting Trebuchet appear.

== Jin Great Wall ==
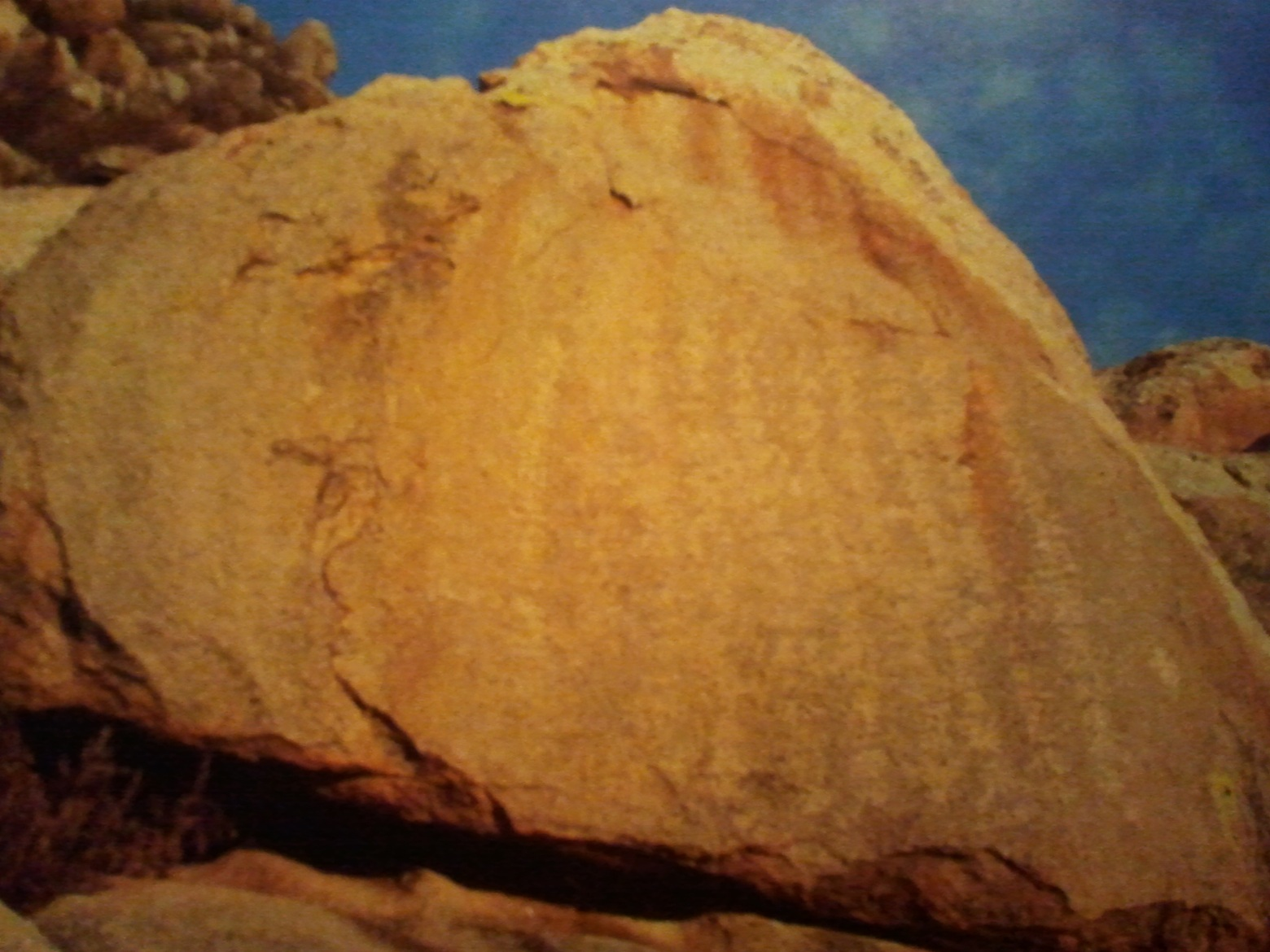
"Great Golden Central State O-Giao Jeo-Shio" (1196), found in what is now Mongolia.

In order to prevent incursion from the Mongols, a large construction program was launched. The records show that two important sections of the Great Wall were completed by the Jurchens.

The Great Wall as constructed by the Jurchens differed from the previous dynasties. Known as the Border Fortress or the Boundary Ditch of the Jin, it was formed by digging ditches and using the excavated earth to build lengths of earthen parapet. The southern branch of the southern wall had a secondary ditch dug along the interior, south-facing side of the wall. The History of Jin refers to the defences as “jiehao” (界壕, boundary trench), or “haoqian” (壕堑, trench chasm/moat), and the act of constructing them as jun (浚, digging), terms which focus on the ditch more than the wall. In some places subsidiary walls and ditches were added for extra strength. The construction was started in about 1123 and completed by about 1198. The two sections attributable to the Jin dynasty are known as the Old Mingchang Walls and New Great Walls, together stretching more than 2,000 kilometres in length.

However, there is no evidence that the wall system was manned at the time of the Mongol attack. The lack of soldiers at the walls may be related to the fact that guarding the wall was the responsibility of the Ongguts, who defected early on to the Mongols. Moreover, even during the Jin dynasty, one minister complained that the walls were a waste of money because they were not solid enough to withstand the desert sandstorms.

== Navy ==
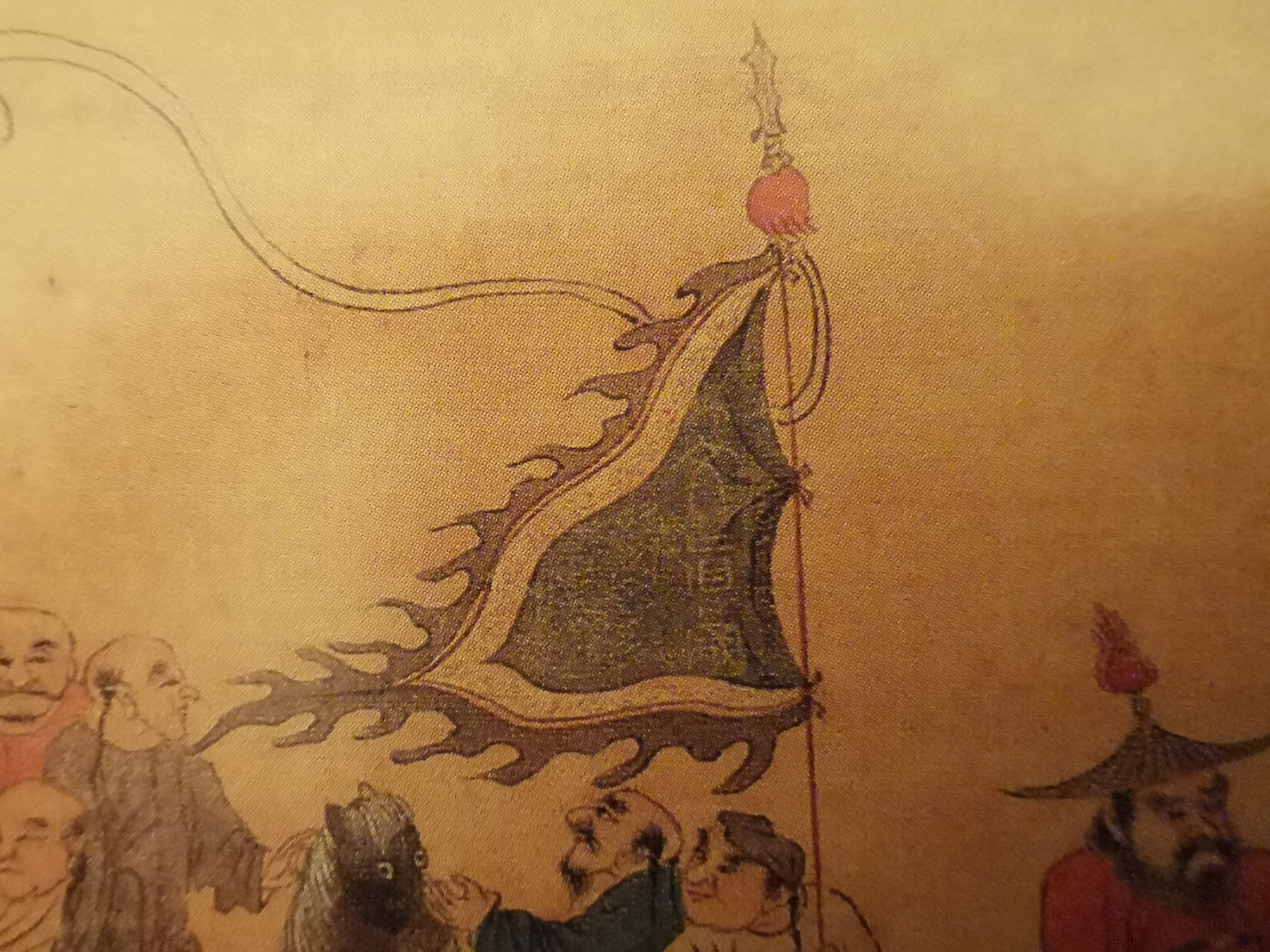
Jin flag

On the other hand, the Jin military was not particularly good at naval warfare. Both in 1129–30 and in 1161 Jin forces were defeated by the Southern Song navies when trying to cross the Yangtze River into the core Southern Song territory (see Battle of Tangdao and Battle of Caishi), even though for the latter campaign the Jin had equipped a large navy of their own, using Han Chinese shipbuilders and even Han Chinese captains who had defected from the Southern Song. Prince Hailing was the first northern conquest dynasty leader to attempt to expand into naval technology, to attack the waterways leading to southern China. This Jin fleet, the first the Jin constructed, were manned by 30,000 Han Chinese sailors. Jin ships were however unable to compete with the Song's because the former were smaller and hastily constructed.

In 1130, the Jin army reached Hangzhou and Ningbo in southern China. But heavy Chinese resistance and the geography of the area halted the Jin advance, and they were forced to retreat and withdraw, and they had not been able to escape the Song navy when trying to return until they were directed by a Han Chinese defector who helped them escape in Zhenjiang. Southern China was then cleared of the Jurchen forces.

In 1161, the Song navy under Li Bao, formed of just 120 ships and 3,000 sailors, attacked the Jin fleet of 600 ships and 100,000 men at their home port. Due to the poor seafaring knowledge of the Jin sailors, the Song were victorious and succeeded in destroying the entire Jin sea fleet in one battle. Meanwhile, the main Jin ground force attempted to cross the Yangtze river with boats made from the wood of dismantled houses, an inadequate fleet that suffered severe defeats at the hands of Yu Yunwen's Song riverine fleet. The Jin invasion force, despite outnumbering the Song force by ten times, was hence forced to withdraw due to their inability to field capable naval forces.

== Legacy ==
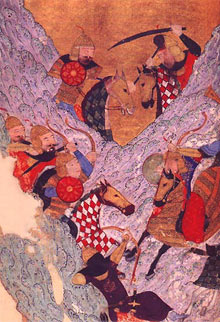
Jin and Mongol horsemen battling, in the "History of the World" by Rashid al-Din.

The Jurchen use of the warband, a group of loyal, semi-nomadic or nomadic warriors who follow their leader in building his empire, came to influence the military organisation of neighbouring Goryeo. These "private troops" became an important feature of Goryeo frontier defenses, as the urgent need to protect the frontier from raiding required courts to grant a position of primacy to immediate and present leaders (including some Jurchen leaders) to lead local horseback forces. The rise of the Jin dynasty and its resulting threat on Goryeo provoked the Myoch'ong rebellion in 1135, as well as the rise of northern frontier general Ch'oe Ch'ung-hŏn, commander of an "Extraordinary Watch", decentralised mobile groups similar in organisation, clothing and equipment to the Jurchen warbands. These warbands also upset the traditional hierarchical order of Goryeo society by granting its members immunity from the law and sharing personal space and items between the commander and his troops. The warband also shaped Goryeo society as a whole after Choe's 1170 military coup, as warbands were critical for military rulers to maintain their hold on power, but also interfered with civilian governance and succession.

With the collapse of the Jin dynasty in the 13th century, numerous Jin forces were incorporated into the Mongol Empire and the subsequent Mongol-led Yuan dynasty of China, who created a Han Jun ("Han Army") out of these defectors. Some of these forces, the former Jin cavalry, were highly regarded and served as cavalrymen equal to the Mongols. One prominent Han Chinese meng'an who defected from the Jin to the Mongols, Guo Baoyu, played a prominent role in advising the Great Khan's early campaigns and policies, and leading gunpowder troops in Mongol campaigns to the west. For instance, Hayton of Armenia remarked that the "Cathayans" (Chinese) "have various kinds of weapons and devices which other nations do not have." Mongol commanders such as Aju praised these Han Jun forces as the "only" troops suited for mountainous, water, or fortified battles.

== See also ==
- Mongol conquest of Jin China
- Jin–Song Wars
- Korean–Jurchen border conflicts
- Timeline of the Jin–Song Wars

== Bibliography ==
- Gernet, Jacques (1996), A History of Chinese Civilization (2nd ed.), Cambridge University Press, ISBN 978-0-521-49781-7
- Twitchett, Denis C.; Fairbank, John King, eds. (1994), The Cambridge History of China: Alien Regimes and Border States 907–1368, vol. 6, Cambridge University Press, ISBN 978-0-521-24331-5
  - Franke, Herbert (1994a). Introduction. In Twitchett & Fairbank (1994), pp. 1–42.
  - Franke, Herbert (1994b). "The Chin dynasty". In Twitchett & Fairbank (1994).
- Franke, Herbert; Twitchett, Denis (1994). "Introduction". In Denis C. Twitchett; Herbert Franke; John K. Fairbank (eds.). The Cambridge History of China: Volume 6, Alien Regimes and Border States, 710–1368. Cambridge University Press. pp. 2–42. ISBN 978-0-521-24331-5.
- Tao, Jing-Shen (2009). "The Move to the South and the Reign of Kao-tsung". In Paul Jakov Smith; Denis C. Twitchett (eds.). The Cambridge History of China: Volume 5, The Sung dynasty and Its Precursors, 907–1279. Cambridge University Press. pp. 556–643. ISBN 978-0-521-81248-1. (hardcover)
- Levine, Ari Daniel (2009). "The Reigns of Hui-tsung (1100–1126) and Ch'in-tsung (1126–1127) and the Fall of the Northern Sung". In Paul Jakov Smith; Denis C. Twitchett (eds.). The Cambridge History of China: Volume 5, The Sung dynasty and Its Precursors, 907–1279. Cambridge University Press. pp. 556–643. ISBN 978-0-521-81248-1. (hardcover)
- Liang, Jieming (2006). Chinese Siege Warfare: Mechanical Artillery & Siege Weapons of Antiquity – An Illustrated History.
- Needham, Joseph (1994), Science and Civilization in China Volume 5 Part 6, Cambridge University Press
- Turnbull, Stephen (2003). Genghis Khan and the Mongol Conquests 1190–1400. Osprey Publishing. ISBN 978-1-84176-523-5.
- Tao, Jing-shen (1976). The Jurchen in Twelfth-Century China. University of Washington Press. ISBN 0-295-95514-7.
