= Battle of Yancheng =

Battle between the Jurchen Jin and the Song

- Part of the Jin–Song wars
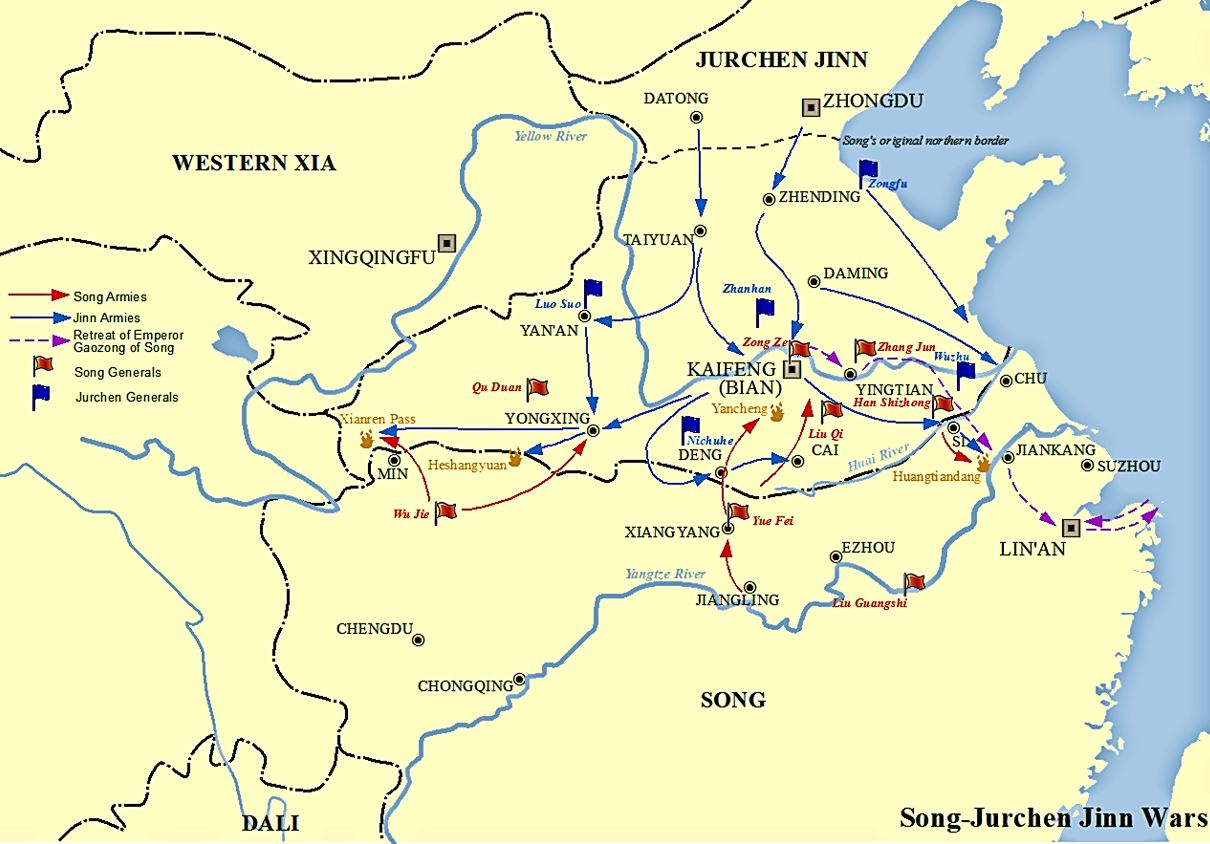
- Song-Jin wars with the location of Yancheng
| Date | 1140 |
| Location | Henan, China |
| Result | Song victory |

Belligerents
| Jin Empire | Song China |

Commanders and leaders
| Wanyan Wuzhu | Yue Fei, Han Shizhong |

Strength
| 100,000; 15,000 cavalrymen Modern estimates - 20,000–30,000 | 500 cavalrymen and 15,000 armored horsemen under the command of General Han Shizhong Modern estimates - 8,000–15,000 |

The Battle of Yancheng (simplified Chinese: 郾城之战; traditional Chinese: 郾城之戰) took place in 1140 near modern-day Luohe City in Henan Province, China between the main armies of China under the Song dynasty and the Jurchen Jin invaders from the north. The battle was a major clash in the wars between the Jin Empire and China. The Chinese forces, under the leadership of General Yue Fei, won a decisive victory despite being outnumbered.

== Background ==
In May 1140, the tenth year of Emperor Gaozong of Song's Shaoxing era (紹興), Wuzhu, fourth son of Emperor Taizu of Jin, invaded the south at the head of the Jin army, threatening the Song on all sides. Yue Fei's West Army marched from Ezhou City in Hubei province towards the central plains to meet the threat. The biography of Yue Fei in Chapter 365 of the History of Song records: "The Jin attacked and surrounded Bo (亳; near modern-day Bozhou City, Anhui Province) whereupon Liu Qi (刘锜) requested emergency assistance from the Imperial court. Yue Fei rushed to the area and sent Generals Zhang Xian (张宪) and Yao Zheng (姚政) to deal with the situation. The emperor issued an edict stating that 'the court was prepared and he was not far away'. Yue Fei then sent Wang Gui (王貴), Niu Gao (牛皋), Dong Xian (董先), Yang Zaixing (杨再兴), Meng Bangjie (孟邦杰) and Li Bao (李宝) amongst others to defend the western capital and the prefectures of Ru (汝), Zheng (郑), Yingchang (颍昌), Chen (陈), Cao (曹) Guang (光) and Cai (蔡). Next Yue Fei ordered Liang Xing (梁兴) to cross the Yellow River, assemble citizens loyal to the emperor and attack Beizhou County (北州县). Troops also moved eastwards to assist Liu Qi and arrived in the Central Plains".

After commanding Yue Fei to counter-attack Emperor Gaozong changed his mind and in June issued a further order recalling the general and his troops. Yue Fei ignored the order as the History of Song records: "Minister Li Ruoxu (李若虚) was sent from the court with orders for Yue Fei to withdraw but he refused to comply."

== Military situation ==
When Wuzhu moved southwards, he split his army into four divisions that used different routes, Yue Fei's army meanwhile was stationed at Yancheng. On August 21, (the 8th day of the seventh month in that year of the Chinese calendar), Wuzhu launched a surprise attack, heading a force of 15,000 horsemen and 100,000 infantry. Yue Fei ordered his Beiwei (背嵬) and Youyi (游奕) cavalry units to attack the Jurchen.

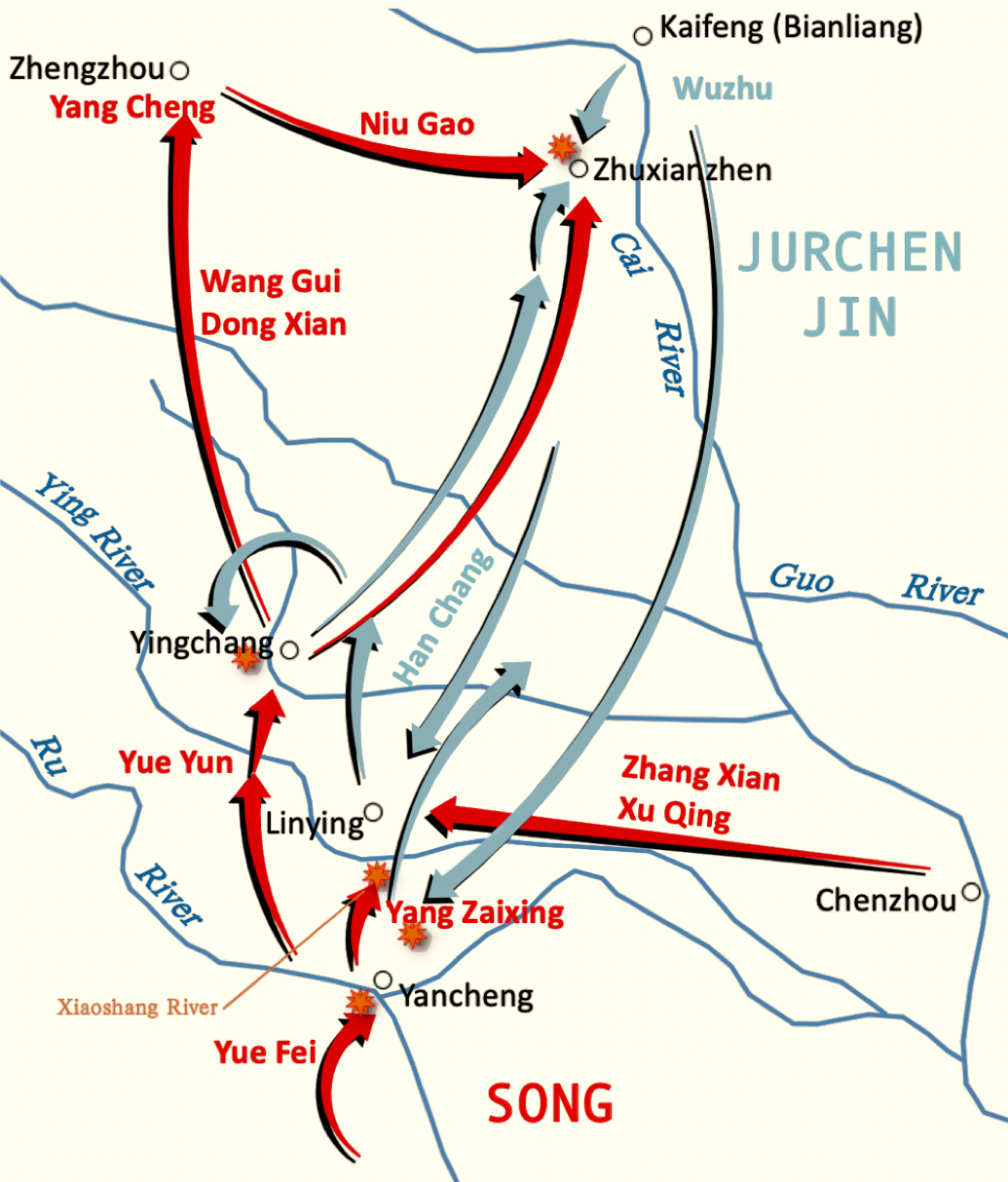
Battles of Yancheng, Yingchang and Zhuxianzhen

During the battle, the Song cavalry employed the Guaizi Ma tactic. They were to be followed by infantry who were to engage the Jurchen in hand-to-hand combat, break the enemy formation and then retreat once darkness fell. After the battle Yue Fei left for the Imperial court where he presented a memorial to the emperor saying: "On the 8th day of this month whilst out scouting, I saw four evil foreign princes, their mighty warriors and Wanyan Zongxian (完顏宗賢). General Han Shizhong led 15,000 of our troops on horseback all dressed in shining armor. They seized the road 20 li (6.6 miles) to the north of Yancheng where our cavalry engaged the enemy in the early evening when officers and men hacked and chopped at the foes with maza swords (麻扎刀), griffes (提刀) and large hatchets. In ten bitter battles, countless enemies were slaughtered, their bodies littering the ground. As twilight fell we withdrew, stealing two hundred horses as we went. I would like to report a great victory and now await further orders from your majesty."

Following his defeat at Yancheng, fourteen days later Wuzhu attacked Yingchang Fu (颍昌府; modern-day Xuchang City in Henan Province). Predicting the next move of the enemy, Yue Fei ordered his adopted son Yue Yun (岳雲) to lead the Beiwei Cavalry with its supporting infantry and go to the aid of the local commander Wang Gui. At the subsequent Battle of Yingchang, the Song were once more victorious when through the use of the Guaizi Ma tactic Wuzhu's entire army was wiped out.

Yue Fei's army recaptured Zhengzhou and Luoyang leaving his troops facing Zhuxian Town (20 kilometres (12 mi) south of modern-day Kaifeng City), Henan. The Han people praised the victory whereupon Yue Fei shouted "Onward gentlemen to Huanglong Fu (黄龙府 near modern-day Nong'an County, Jilin Province), where we can drink our fill!" According to historical records, during this battle Yue Fei and his army captured more than 200 horses and killed countless enemies.

When Emperor Gaozong heard the news, he was exultant and exclaimed: “If we have worn down the enemy's strength and left them exhausted it will be easy to seize the chance to exterminate them, if they are hiding some wicked plan we should understand and second guess them.” When Yue Fei's army arrived at Zhuxian the two sides opposing stood facing one another. After a struggle Wuzhu withdrew to Kaifeng. After the Battle of Yancheng, the Jin army bewailed their situation crying “to shake the mountains is easy, to shake Yue Fei's army is barely possible” (撼山易，撼岳家军难).

== Aftermath ==
After receiving several high level reports confirming the victory at Yancheng, Emperor Gaozong rewarded his officers and men. He issued an edict saying:

"Yue Fei, for fifteen years the Jiehu (羯胡) invaded and plundered. I prepared for battle no less than a million troops and did not hear from this distant lone army. This was a major disaster so to resist the horde of the Quanrong, in the fields and in the wilderness, today I make this pronouncement. You are loyal and righteous, linked with the gods who provide power and confidence for our soldiers. As experts on this expedition, all thoughts were to overthrow the enemy; to resolutely trap and annihilate our foes without a second thought. You repeatedly fought and hurried to defeat these villains; directing your arrows to inflict the bitterest injuries upon these barbarians. You took what little remained of their strength and roused an army whose names will go down in history for bringing me urgent news of the enemy's extermination. Your loyalty and devotion moves me to sigh deeply. I grant your soldiers a reward of 200,000 strings of cash hereby making known the reason for the reward.

Emperor Gaozong was unwilling to let Yue Fei continue his advance and in succession sent out twelve gold medals recalling the troops stationed in Zhu Xian under the general. By this time Zhang Jun (張俊) and his army had retreated along South Huainan Road leaving Yue Fei isolated and without help. As his army retreated he lamented:

Ten years of achievement destroyed in a single day! All the captured territories gone in one morning.

Emperor Gaozong supported a peace treaty with the Jurchens and sought to rein in the assertiveness of the military. The military expeditions of Yue Fei and other generals were an obstacle to negotiations for peace. The government weakened the military by demoting the generals and rewarded them with different titles. Yue Fei resisted by announcing his resignation as an act of protest. He was imprisoned in 1141 and poisoned a year later. Jurchen diplomatic pressure during the peace negotiations may have played a role. A peace treaty, the Shaoxing Treaty, was settled on in 1141 and completed in 1142, ending hostilities between the Jin and Song.

== Assessment ==
According to Ma Duanlin "Investigation of the meritorious service of the followers of Zhang Jun, Han Shizhong, Liu Guangshi (刘光世) and Yue Fei shows that they also had some internal strife. They pacified the provinces of the south east and were not defeated by the Jin but instead evaded them. Even though the Song won some small victories these did not compensate for previous mistakes." Former Shanghai Guanghua University Professor of History Lü Simian wrote in his Baihua Benguoshi (白话本国史, literally: Vernacular History of China): "As regards their initial deployment of troops the Song Imperial court appeared victorious against the Jin. However at Shunchang (顺昌), and Yancheng, Wuzhu underestimated his enemy and was thus defeated. What he did to rectify this situation is not known. The conflict in Shaanxi Province ended in a stalemate from which it may be said no victor emerged. Clearly, viewed from an overall perspective this protracted situation was disadvantageous to the Song Imperial court."

Well known 20th century historian Deng Guangming believes that there was no fundamental victory when the Song and the Jin clashed at Zhu Xian. Yue Fei's supply lines had been cut by the Jin army and he lacked reinforcements: “However, whilst it is certainly true that Yue Fei's army were 'harder to shake than the mountains', it was unnecessary for them to find another route controlled by friendly forces. Yue Fei's army was only in a position to resist southward attacks by Jin troops along the roads from Hebei and Shandong Provinces. As a result, Yue Fei and his troops could march northward during the day as indications were that the Jin army were already preparing its imminent retreat from Henan Province. At the same time, Yue Fei's army were already moving south towards the Song Imperial court, needing its immediate orders for all troops to advance at full speed. By the time Zhang Jun's army had withdrawn from Bozhou the Jin army were in the process of attacking Yue Fei's forces at Yancheng and Yingchang in a series of engagements. Although he was marginally victorious in these, in an overall strategic assessment of the war Yue Fei was the loser."

Deng Guangming goes on to point out in Chapter 15 of his Biography of Yue Fei that at the time of the Southern Song Imperial court's commendation of Yue Fei: “The victory of Yue Fei's army at the Battle of Yancheng had not been easily won. If this army had met up with the forces of Zhang Jun and Wang De (王德), a subordinate of General Zhang Guangshi, as they withdrew along the Huainan East Road (淮南东路) it can be imagined that this would have been a morale booster for Yue Fei's army at this difficult time in the campaign."

Contemporary Song Dynasty historian and expert Wang Cengyu (王曾瑜) notes that: “The great battles of Yancheng and Yinchang took place during the wet months of June and July in the Central Plains area. Here the Jin cavalry showed off their speed and skill making the few victories achieved difficult for Yue Fei and his army.” and "Comparative evidence from the Zhuzi yulei regarding the battle at Zhu Xian shows that "Two separate parts of Yue Fei's army marched from the approximate locations of Linying and Yingchang to Xiangbian Du (向汴都), when there is the strong probability that they attacked and slaughtered the Jin army at Zhuxian."

Wang Cengyu also claims that during the withdrawal of the Yue Fei Battalion, Liu Qi had the enemy pinned down and assisted the retreating troops although other sources claim he is mistaken.

== Notes ==
1. Some sources give the date as 1140 CE. This may be due to discrepancies between the Julian and lunar calendars.
2. One string of cash was equivalent to a tael of silver (about 40 grams), making the total reward around 10,000 kilograms (22,000 lb) of silver.
3. 十年之功，毀於一旦！所得州郡，一朝全休。
