= Xizong =

Xizong may refer to:

- Emperor Xizong of Tang (僖宗) (862–888; reigned 873–888), Chinese emperor of the Tang Dynasty
- Emperor Xizong of Jin (熙宗) (1119–1150; reigned 1135–1150), Jurchen emperor of the Jin Dynasty
- Tianqi Emperor (1605–1627; reigned 1620–1627), Chinese emperor of the Ming Dynasty, also known as Emperor Xizong (熹宗) of Ming
