= General Liu Meng =

Chinese deity believed to protect crops from locusts

General Liu Meng (Chinese: 刘猛将军; pinyin: Liú Měng Jiāngjūn), also known as Liu Mengjiang (刘猛将), is a deity in Chinese folk religion. He is worshipped as a god who protects crops from locusts and other agricultural pests. His worship became widespread during the Ming and Qing dynasties, particularly in the Jiangnan region. Several historical figures and local legends have been linked to his identity.

== Origins ==
There are several accounts of General Liu Meng's identity. One identifies him as Liu Qi (刘锜), a Southern Song general who fought against the Jin dynasty. According to later records, Liu Qi was honoured as a god after a locust plague was brought under control during the reign of Emperor Lizong of Song. He was given the titles of Yangwei Hou (扬威侯) and Tiancao Mengjiang (天曹猛将). Another tradition identifies the god as Liu Rui (刘锐), who was said to be Liu Qi's younger brother and a military officer.

The Hongwu Suzhou Fu Zhi (洪武苏州府志), a gazetteer from the early Ming dynasty, records a temple dedicated to a god surnamed Liu, but does not clearly identify him as General Liu Meng. Later local records provide more information about the worship of Liu Meng in the Suzhou region.

Another account identifies General Liu Meng as Liu Chengzhong (刘承忠), a military commander of the Yuan dynasty. According to this tradition, he served in the Jianghuai region during a locust plague. He drove the insects away with his sword and later drowned himself after the fall of the Yuan dynasty. An account of his identity was said to have been obtained through spirit writing. The Qing government later accepted the story of Liu Chengzhong as the identity of General Liu Meng.

Other local stories describe Liu Meng as a poor boy who drowned after being mistreated by his family. In some Jiangnan traditions, he is shown as a barefoot child with a red cloth around his head and a sword in his hand. Historian Zhao Shiyu suggests that these stories may belong to an older form of Liu Meng worship among people who lived and worked on the waterways around Lake Tai.

A different legend is found in Dunhuang, Gansu. It tells of a Qing official named Liu Meng who was sent to supervise the building of government granaries in 1778. He chose to build the granaries on higher ground outside the city to keep the grain dry. The stored grain was said to remain free from insects for several years. Liu Meng also encouraged farmers to use plant ash to control pests. Local people called him the "Granary God" (廒神) and the "Living King of Insects" (活虫王). According to the legend, he was later executed after being falsely accused of wrongdoing, but was cleared of the charges after his death. The people built a temple in his honour near the granaries.

== State worship ==
During the early Qing dynasty, the worship of General Liu Meng was sometimes banned by local officials. In 1686, Tang Bin (汤斌), the governor of Jiangsu, ordered the destruction of temples dedicated to Liu Meng and several other local deities in the Suzhou region. He regarded these forms of worship as yin si (淫祀), or religious practices that were not permitted by the government.

The Qing government later began to support Liu Meng's worship. In 1724, during the reign of the Yongzheng Emperor, an imperial order directed provincial and local officials to build temples and hold ceremonies in his honour. Liu Meng was recognized as a god who could drive away locusts and protect crops. His worship was later included in the Da Qing Huidian (大清会典), which called him the "Orthodox God for Driving Away Locusts" (驱蝗正神).

In 1745, the Qianlong Emperor ordered the removal of the Ba La (八蜡) sacrifices from the state ritual system. These older rites honoured eight agricultural deities, including gods linked to insects and crop protection. Although the state stopped performing the rites, people in many areas continued to worship the Ba La gods. Liu Meng and Ba La worship sometimes took place in the same temples.

The Qing court continued to give General Liu Meng new honorific titles. In 1857, during the reign of the Xianfeng Emperor, he was given the title Baokang (保康). Other titles were added during the reigns of the Tongzhi and Guangxu emperors. By 1886, his full title was Baokang Puyou Xianying Linghui Xiangji Yihua Lingfu Liu Meng Jiangjun (保康普佑显应灵惠襄济翊化灵孚刘猛将军). His official ceremonies were held with honours similar to those given to Guan Sheng Dadi (关圣大帝).

The worship of Liu Meng also spread to Xinjiang under the Qing dynasty. In 1766, the Qianlong Emperor ordered officials in Ili to establish places of worship for Liu Meng and the Ba La gods. Separate temples were later built in Huiyuan, where the two traditions continued to be worshipped side by side.

== Folk worship and customs ==
Tai Mengjiang (抬猛将, "Carrying General Meng") is a folk custom found in villages around Lake Tai. During the festival, villagers carry a statue of General Liu Meng in a palanquin through the streets and visit nearby temples, homes, and businesses. People burn incense and prepare offerings to ask for blessings and protection from harm.

In Jiangjia Village, Xukou, Wuzhong District, Suzhou, the procession is held on the thirteenth day of the first lunar month. The local custom is called Chibo Tai Mengjiang (赤膊抬猛将), or "Carrying General Meng Bare-Chested", because young men carry the palanquin without shirts. The procession visits nearby villages, temples, businesses, and homes. Residents prepare food, incense, and other offerings. The custom was added to the Wuzhong District intangible cultural heritage list in 2014. After Jiangjia Village was relocated in 2019, the temple and festival activities were moved to Xuwang Garden (胥王园).

Liu Meng was also worshipped in water processions. Historical records from Jiangnan describe large gatherings of boats carrying worshippers to temples dedicated to the god. At Liansidang (莲泗荡), near the border of Jiangsu and Zhejiang, boat communities held large festivals in his honour. These festivals were an important part of local religious life during the late Qing dynasty and the Republican period.

Historian Zhao Shiyu studied the Tai Mengjiang custom in his book Mengjiang Returns Home: A New History of Dongshan, Jiangnan (《猛将还乡：洞庭东山的新江南史》). He argues that Liu Meng may originally have been a god worshipped by people who lived on boats around Lake Tai. As these communities moved onto land and became farmers, their temples became part of village life. The worship of Liu Meng also changed, and he became known more widely as a god who protected crops from locusts.

In Shandong, Liu Meng temples were built in several places during the Qing dynasty. One was in Changqing District, Jinan, where it was also called the "Grasshopper Temple" (蚂蚱庙). During the Qianlong period, local officials, scholars, and merchants helped pay for its repair and expansion. Other Liu Meng temples were built in Licheng, Zouping, and Zhangqiu.

Liu Meng was often worshipped alongside other gods who protected crops from insects. In the Jinan region, his worship sometimes became mixed with that of the Ba La gods. The temples could be dedicated to both traditions, and local people sometimes treated them as the same. In 1764, a Liu Meng Temple on Dongjie Street in Licheng was converted into a temple for Jin Gu Niangniang (金姑娘娘), another deity believed to protect crops from insects. The change was made by Cui Yingjie, the governor of Shandong.
