= Empress Daoping =

Empress Daoping 悼平皇后

Empress consort of the Jin dynasty
- Tenure: 1138 – 1149
- Predecessor: Empress Qinren
- Successor: Empress Tudan
- Died: 1149
- Spouse: Emperor Xizong of Jin
- Issue: Ji'an; Princess Daiguo
Posthumous name
- Empress Dàopíng _{(after 1161)} 悼平皇后; Empress Dào _{(1150 – 1161)} 悼皇后
- Clan: Peiman (by birth); Wanyan (by marriage)
- Dynasty: Jin
- Father: Huta
- Mother: Lady Wanyan

Empress Daoping
- Chinese: 悼平皇后裴滿氏
Transcriptions
Standard Mandarin
- Hanyu Pinyin: Dàopíng huánghòu péimǎn shì

Empress Daoping of the Peiman clan (d.1149) was the wife of the third emperor of the Jurchen-led Chinese Jin dynasty, Emperor Xizong.

== Biography ==
Lady Peiman was the daughter of Huta of the Peiman clan. When her husband became emperor in 1135, she was promoted to imperial consort. In 1138, she was made empress, and her father, grandfather, and great-grandfather all received promotions.

In 1141, the Empress received the honorific title of Empress Ci ming gong xiaoshun (Chinese: 慈明恭孝顺德皇后).

The Empress gave birth to a son named Ji'an in 1142. Emperor Xizong celebrated by implementing a general amnesty and making sacrifices at the ancestral temple. One month after his birth, the boy was named heir apparent, with the Empress' father also promoted to mark the occasion, receiving both lands and livestock. Before he reached one year old, Ji'an fell ill and died.

After the death of Ji'an and another son by Consort Xian, several years went by when Xizong had no male heirs. Empress Daojing also became involved in politics and exercised substantial control over the Emperor. He became increasingly frustrated and developed an alcohol dependency. Whilst drunk, Xizong could be extremely violent, and he often killed people. On the occasion of Digunai's birthday, both Emperor Xizong and the Empress gave him gifts. When the Emperor found out that the Empress had also presented gifts, he beat the messenger and took back the gifts.

In 1149, the Emperor had the Empress strangled. A month later, as her daughter conducted Buddhist rites at a temple, the Empress' son-in-law, Wogula, and Digunai stabbed Xizong to death. Digunai then conferred the posthumous title of Empress Dao on her and promoted her father. Emperor Shizong later changed this to Empress Daoping and had her buried in Siling (Chinese: 思陵).

== Title ==
During the reign of Emperor Taizong of Jin (27 September 1123 – 9 February 1135)

- Lady Peiman (裴滿氏, d. 1149)

During the reign of Emperor Xizong of Jin (10 February 1135 – 9 January 1150)

- Noble Consort (貴妃; from 1137)
- Empress (皇后; from December 1138)
- Empress Daoping (悼平皇后; from 1149)

== Issue ==
As Empress :

- Wanyan Ji'an, Crown Prince Yingdao (英悼太子 完顏濟安, 23 March 1142 – 13 January 1143), the emperor 1st son
- Princess of Dai State (代國公主)

== Family ==
- Father: Huta (忽撻) (d.1152), sincised name Peiman Huda (裴滿忽達)
- Mother: Lady Wanyan of the Jin imperial clan
- Husband: Emperor Xizong of Jin (28 February 1119 – 9 January 1150)
  - Son: Wanyan Ji'an (23 March 1142 – 13 January 1143) (完顏濟安)
  - Daughter: Princess Daiguo (代國公主)
    - Son-in-law: Wogula (d.1150) (斡骨剌), sincised name Tang Kuobian (唐括辯)
