= Wuzhu =

Jin dynasty prince, general and official (died 1148)

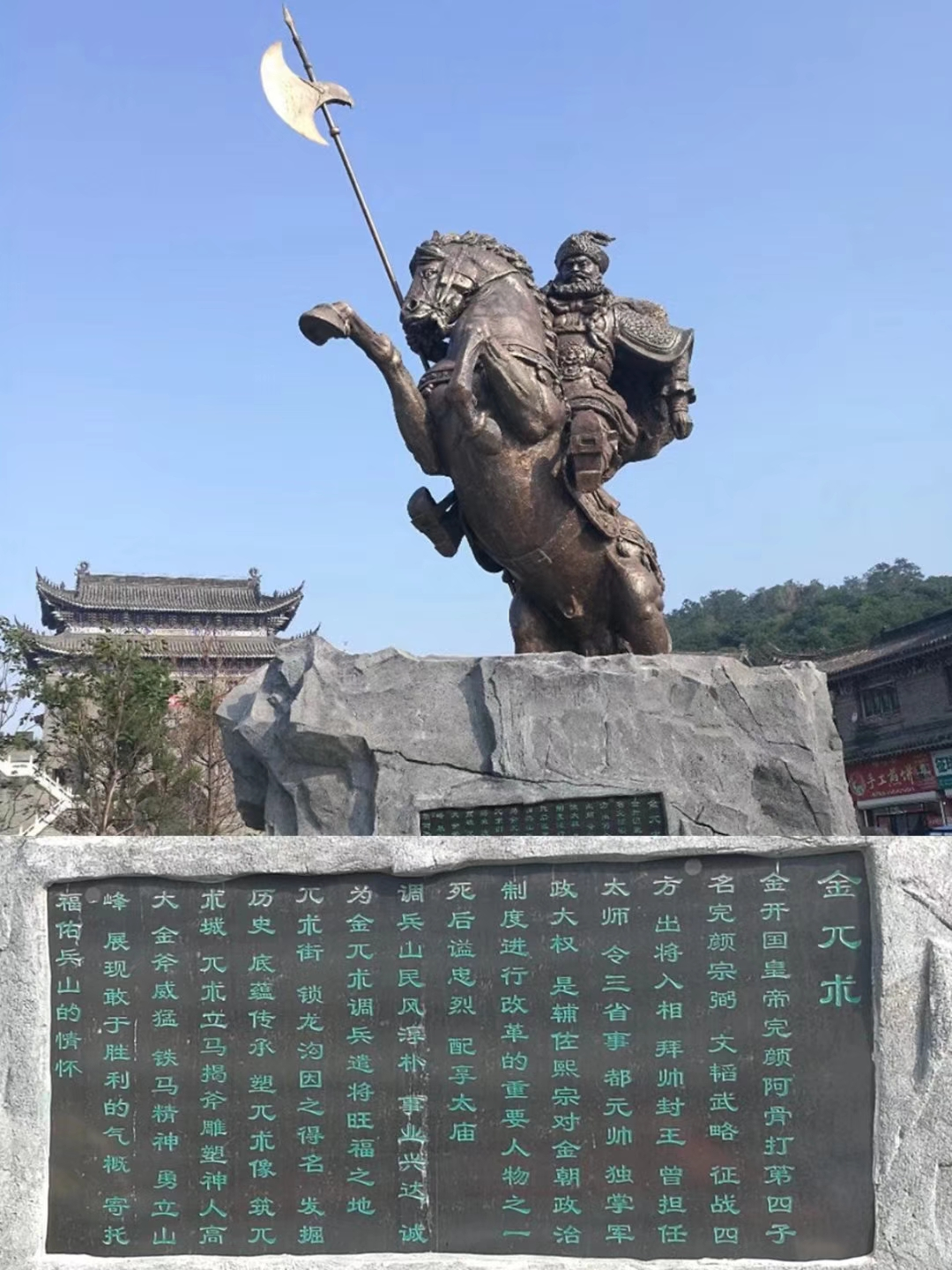
- Statue of Wuzhu in Diaobingshan, Tieling, Liaoning
- Born: Wuzhu (斡啜 / 兀朮 / 烏珠); Unknown
- Died: 1148
- Other names: Wanyan Zongbi (完顏宗弼); Wang Zongbi (王宗弼); Jin Wuzhu (金兀朮)
- Military career
- Allegiance: Jin dynasty
- Conflicts: Jin–Song Wars

Wuzhu
- Traditional Chinese: 兀朮
- Simplified Chinese: 兀术
Transcriptions
Standard Mandarin
- Hanyu Pinyin: Wùzhū

Wanyan Zongbi
- Traditional Chinese: 完顏宗弼
- Simplified Chinese: 完颜宗弼
Transcriptions
Standard Mandarin
- Hanyu Pinyin: Wányán Zōngbì

Jin Wuzhu
- Traditional Chinese: 金兀朮
- Simplified Chinese: 金兀术
Transcriptions
Standard Mandarin
- Hanyu Pinyin: Jīn Wùzhū

Jin Wuzhu (金兀朮, died 1148), also known by his sinicised name Wanyan Zongbi (完顏宗弼), was a prince, military general and civil minister of the Jurchen-led Jin dynasty of China. He was the fourth son of Aguda (Emperor Taizu), the founder and first emperor of the Jin dynasty. Wuzhu started his career in the military in his youth, when he participated in the Jurchen rebellion led by his father against the Khitan-led Liao dynasty. Between the late 1120s and 1130s, he fought for the Jin dynasty in a series of wars against the Han-led Northern Song dynasty and its successor state, the Southern Song dynasty. In 1137, in recognition of his contributions in battle, he was appointed as Right Vice-Marshal (右副元帥) and enfeoffed as the "Prince of Shen" (瀋王). In the final decade of his life, he was appointed to several high-ranking positions in the Jin imperial court, including Left Chancellor (左丞相), Palace Attendant, Taibao (太保), Marshal of the Capital (都元帥), Taifu (太傅), and Taishi (太師). He died of illness in 1148. Throughout his life, he had served under three Jin emperors – Emperor Taizu (his father), Emperor Taizong (his uncle), and Emperor Xizong (his nephew).

== Life ==
=== Family background ===
Wuzhu was born in the Wanyan tribe, the most prominent among the Jurchen tribes residing in the area around present-day Harbin, Heilongjiang Province. He was the fourth son of Aguda, the chief of the Wanyan tribe, which was a subject of the Khitan-led Liao dynasty. Wuzhu's mother was Lady Wugulun (烏古論氏), one of Aguda's concubines. She also bore Aguda two other sons, Alu (阿魯; Wanyan Zongqiang) and Alubu (阿魯補; Wanyan Zongmin). Wuzhu had at 13 other brothers and three sisters born to his father's other wives.

=== War against the Liao dynasty ===
In the spring of 1114, Aguda united the Jurchen tribes under his leadership and started a rebellion against the Liao dynasty. In 1117, after the Jurchens had conquered several Liao cities, Aguda declared himself emperor and established the Jin dynasty. In December 1121, Wuzhu, then a teenager, participated in battle against Liao forces. When the Jurchens received news that the Liao ruler, Emperor Tianzuo, was out on a hunting expedition at Yuanyang Lake (鴛鴦濼; northwest of present-day Zhangbei County, Hebei Province), Wolibu (斡離不; Wanyan Zongwang) and Wuzhu led an army to attack the Liao emperor in the hope of catching him off guard. During the battle, Wuzhu, after expending all his arrows, seized a Liao soldier's weapon and continued fighting. He killed eight enemy soldiers and captured five, and became famous after the battle.

By 1124, the Liao dynasty had lost most of its territories to the Jurchens. On 26 March 1125, Emperor Tianzuo was captured by Jin forces led by Wanyan Loushi (完顏婁室) in Yingzhou (應州; in present-day northern Shanxi Province). Months later, he was sent to the Jin capital in Shangjing (上京; present-day Acheng District, Harbin, Heilongjiang Province).

=== War against the Northern Song dynasty ===
Wuzhu participated in the Jin–Song Wars, which broke out in 1125 between the Jin dynasty and the Han Chinese-led Northern Song dynasty. He served as an officer in the Jin dynasty's Eastern Army, which was commanded by his second brother, Wolibu (斡離不; Wanyan Zongwang), who held the appointment of Right Vice-Marshal (右副元帥). In the first month of 1126, Wolibu sent Wuzhu to attack Tangyin County; Wuzhu won the battle and forced the 3,000 Song defenders to surrender. Soon after, the Eastern Army reached the Yellow River and attempted to cross, but the Song forces had already set the pontoon bridges on fire. The Jin officer Helusuo (合魯索) led 70 horsemen to cross the river at a shallow point and killed 500 Song soldiers burning the bridges. Wolibu sent Wu Xiaomin (吳孝民) as a messenger to the Song capital, Bianjing (present-day Kaifeng, Henan Province), to admonish the Song dynasty for breaking its earlier alliance with the Jin dynasty. At the same time, Wuzhu, leading 3,000 light cavalry, approached Bianjing. When he received news that the Song ruler, Emperor Huizong, had fled from Bianjing after abdicating the throne to his son Emperor Qinzong, he led his horsemen in pursuit but failed to capture the emperor. However, they managed to obtain 3,000 horses. When Jin forces besieged Bianjing, the Song dynasty agreed to cede Taiyuan, Zhongshan (中山) and Hejian (河間) prefectures to the Jin dynasty in return for peace. The Jurchens agreed and retreated back to Yanjing (燕京; present-day Beijing).

In the eighth month of 1126, Wuzhu accompanied Wolibu to attack the Song dynasty. By the fourth month of the following year, Jin forces had conquered Bianjing and captured the Song emperors Huizong and Qinzong. This event, historically known as the Jingkang Incident, marked the fall of the Northern Song dynasty.

Wolibu died of illness in the sixth month of 1127 and was succeeded by his third brother, Eliduo (訛里朵; Wanyan Zongfu or Wanyan Zongyao), as Right Vice-Marshal (右副元帥). In the 12th month, Eliduo received orders to suppress anti-Jin rebellions in Shandong Province. Wuzhu participated in the campaign. First, he defeated a few thousand troops led by Song general Zheng Zongmeng (鄭宗孟) in Qingzhou. Next, he defeated the Huangqiong forces (黃瓊軍) led by Song general Zhao Cheng (趙成) in Linqu. In the first month of 1128, when Eliduo and his army were planning to retreat after successfully suppressing the rebellions, they were ambushed at Qinghe (青河) by a 30,000-strong Song army. Wuzhu led the attack on the enemy and killed thousands of them.

=== War against the Southern Song dynasty ===
In the seventh month of 1128, the Jin ruler, Emperor Taizong, ordered the capture of Zhao Gou (Emperor Gaozong), the Song Emperor Huizong's ninth son. Zhao Gou had declared himself emperor, escaped to Yangzhou, and established the Southern Song dynasty as a successor to the fallen Northern Song dynasty. Wuzhu led his own troops to join his third brother, Eliduo (訛里朵; Wanyan Zongfu or Wanyan Zongyao), the Right Vice-Marshal (右副元帥), to attack the Southern Song regime. Wuzhu first attacked Guide Prefecture (歸德府; present-day Shangqiu, Henan Province) but was forced to redirect his forces to attack Puzhou (濮州; around present-day Puyang, Henan Province) instead after realising they had insufficient supplies. The Jin army's vanguard, commanded by Wulinda Taiyu (烏林答泰欲), defeated a 200,000-strong Song army led by Wang Shan (王善) and conquered Puzhou along with five counties in the vicinity. Wuzhu personally led his troops into battle during the subsequent attacks on Kaide Prefecture (開德府) and Daming Prefecture (大名府; in present-day Handan, Hebei Province) and achieved victory. By then, all of Hebei had been occupied by the Jin dynasty.

In early 1129, Wuzhu was promoted to Right Vice-Marshal. Nianhan sent Wuzhu, Wanyan Chang (完顏昌), Balisu (拔離速) and Mawu (馬五) to invade the Southern Song dynasty by two routes. Emperor Gaozong fled southwards from Yangzhou. Wuzhu moved in upon Guide Prefecture (present-day Shangqiu, Henan Province), and the Song generals guarding the city surrendered just before his troops attacked. The cities and towns Wuzhu passed through were all easily captured or gave up without a struggle. Wuzhu kept carrying his victorious arms to the north bank of the Yangtze River, and occupied Hezhou (present-day He County, Anhui Province), an important city to the north of the Yangtze River. Wuzhu intended to cross the river from Caishiji (in present-day Anhui Province), but was blocked by the Song troops from Taipingzhou (太平州) at the ferry, and could not cross the river for three days. So Wuzhu turned to Majiadu (馬家渡) and beat the garrison, beheading the Song general Chen Cui (陳淬). In November, Wuzhu crossed the river and defeated the Song troops led by Du Chong (杜充), capturing Jiankang (present-day Nanjing). Having assigned the subordinate generals to the neighboring towns, he headed the army in person to capture Guangdejunlu (廣德軍路) and Huzhou (in present-day Zhejiang Province), and arrived in Lin'an (present-day Hangzhou). Hearing that Lin'an was to fall, Emperor Gaozong escaped to Mingzhou (present-day Ningbo, Zhejiang Province). Wuzhu sent Ali (阿里) and Puluhun (蒲盧渾) as the spearhead with 4,000 veteran soldiers to chase Emperor Gaozong, and sent another two generals to capture Yuezhou with dramatic swiftness. Ali's army approached Mingzhou after successive victories, and Emperor Gaozong had to escape by sea. Soon afterwards Wuzhu rushed to Mingzhou and captured it. Ali and Puluhun sailed across the sea to Changguo County (present-day Zhoushan Island, Zhejiang Province) and captured the governor of Mingzhou. Learning that Emperor Gaozong had fled to Fuzhou by way of Wenzhou, they pursued at sea but fell back after being blocked by Song naval forces. Wuzhu led his troops back to Lin'an.

In February, 1130, Wuzhu declared that he had finished the search for Emperor Gaozong, and moved back north along the Jinghang canal, carrying large amounts of gold, silver, treasures and jewels plundered by the troops from all places of Jiangnan. Before leaving, he committed Lin'an, which was a city steeped in history, to the flames, and his troops burnt, killed and looted on their way, which became a calamity for the people in Jiangnan. In March, Wuzhu's army arrived in Zhenjiang. They were blocked by Han Shizhong's troops. The navy led by Han Shizhong had huge and lofty warships which were guarding the estuary, preventing Jin troops from crossing. Jin troops had less and smaller battleships and were not good at battles on water, though they outnumbered their enemies. At the beginning, Jin troops suffered great losses, and Wuzhu still could not cross the river after a stalemate for 48 days. His troops had to penetrate up the river to Jiankang. When they got to Huangtiandang, the troops dug a 15-kilometre canal along the old water channel of the Laoguan River (老鹳河) overnight, which led to the Qinhuai River and finally enabled them to escape back to Jiankang. Since Han Shizhong pursued to Jiankang and blockaded the river with warships, Wuzhu posted a reward for the scheme to destroy the warships to cross the river. A man from Fujian Province gave him a suggestion of shooting flaming arrows into the sails of the warships, which could not move without wind. Wuzhu followed his advice and made flaming arrows that very night. On a still sunny day, Wuzhu carried out the scheme and succeeded. Countless Song soldiers were burnt to death or drowned in the river. Han Shizhong had to abandon his ship and escape back to Zhenjiang with only dozens of his men.

In May, Jin troops set fire to Jiankang before they headed back to the north crossing the Yangtze River. On their way back, Wuzhu's army was attacked by the troops led by Song general Yue Fei, and suffered a heavy loss.

In September, 1130, Emperor Taizong of Jin made Eliduo command the armies of Shaanxi to attack Sichuan and Shaanxi provinces, followed by Wuzhu with his own army. The Jin and Song dynasties fought the battle in Fuping. At that time, the Song soldiers were several times more than those of Jin, and Wuzhu and his soldiers were surrounded by the troops led by Zhang Jun, the local military commissioner of Shaanxi, and had a hard time. With the help of Wanyan Loushi, they finally got through the close siege. With the recovery of Jin troops, the commander of Song troops got afraid and deserted on the eve of battle, which led to the failure of the Song. Not long after the battle in Fuping, Eliduo and Wuzhu captured most of the lands in Shaanxi Province.

In January, 1131, Eliduo went back to Yanjing, and Wuzhu took the lead of the armies of Shaanxi. In September, Wuzhu led his soldiers to invade Sichuan Province. While he made his way through Heshangyuan (southeast of present-day Baoji, Shaanxi Province), he met heavy resistance by the Song generals Wu Jie and Wu Lin. Wuzhu lost almost half of his troops and was shot by an arrow, which became his biggest failure since he started serving the military. Two years later in November, Wuzhu's troops marched again and this time they defeated Wu Lin and captured Heshangyuan. In February the next year, Wuzhu sent out troops but was defeated by Wu Jie. In March he returned to Yanjing.

In 1139, the Jin ruler, Emperor Xizong, accepted Wuzhu's proposal and declared war against the Song dynasty again. The Jurchen troops invaded the area, which had been given back to the Song dynasty in Henan and Shaanxi provinces. Because many of the generals used to be Jin officers, they soon surrendered and within one month the Jin dynasty captured most of the area as mentioned before. In that case, Yue Fei and other generals had to retreat to the south of Yingchang (present-day Xuchang, Henan Province), and Wuzhu garrisoned at Bianjing without difficulty. Wuzhu had intended to strike while the iron is hot and captured the area to the north of the Huai River, so he led his army to the north. But was defeated by Liu Qi in Shunchang (present-day Fuyang, Anhui Province), and got a worse defeat by Yue Fei in Yancheng (in present-day Henan Province) and Yingchang. Wuzhu was within an inch of being captured. The situation was very good for Song dynasty, and Yue Fei was going to recapture the area in Henan and Hebei. But Emperor Gaozong commanded Yue Fei to go back to the capital, so the army of Song retreated from Henan.

Wuzhu had never given up the idea of being bounded on the Huai River with Song forces, though he had met with severe defeat. In February 1141, he captured Luzhou and fought a battle with Song forces in Tuogao (in present-day Anhui Province), but was severely defeated. Wuzhu exploited Qin Hui, the Song chancellor, to kill Yue Fei, and later declared that he was willing to keep peace with the Song dynasty. Emperor Gaozong agreed to have peace talks with the Jin dynasty, and the next year the two countries signed a peace agreement, which is called the "Treaty of Shaoxing".

=== Political career ===
In 1137, Wuzhu was appointed as Right Vice-Marshal (右副元帥) and enfeoffed as the "Prince of Shen" (沈王) by Emperor Xizong in recognition of his contributions in battle. In the 11th month of that year, the Jin dynasty abolished the puppet regime of Qi and brought it back under centralised control.

In 1138, Wanyan Zongpan and Wanyan Zongjuan seized power. They connected with Left Vice-Marshal Talan and gave back some areas in Henan and Shaanxi provinces to the Song dynasty. Wuzhu, Wanyan Zonggan and others firmly disagreed with them. The next year, Emperor Xizong charged Wanyan Zongpan and Wanyan Zongjuan with treason and ordered their execution. He also stripped Talan of his military command.

Later, Wuzhu was appointed as Marshal of the Capital (都元帥) and "Prince of Yue" (越王). In 1140, Wuzhu found evidence that Talan had connections with the Song dynasty. Emperor Xizong made Wuzhu kill Talan, after which appointed Wuzhu as Taibao (太保; Grand Protector).

In November, Wuzhu went to the imperial court, at which time Emperor Xizong was on a trip to Yanjing, with Left Vice-Marshal Wanyan Xiyin by his side. Wuzhu wanted to go back to his own mansion. At the farewell dinner, Wanyan Xiyin and Wuzhu had an unhappy conversation, which made Wuzhu very angry. The next day when Wuzhu said goodbye to the empress, he told the details that Wanyan Xiyin was up to no good. After his leaving, the empress told everything to Emperor Xizong. The emperor recalled Wuzhu back and permitted him to kill Wanyan Xiyin. Wuzhu forced Wanyan Xiyin and his two sons to commit suicide, and killed Xiao Qing and his son. The next year, Wuzhu was appointed as Left Chancellor and Shizhong (侍中), and was still the Marshal of the Capital.

In March, 1142, Wuzhu was appointed as Taifu (太傅). In November 1147, he was appointed as Taishi (太師; Grand Tutor). After the Shaoxing Treaty, Wuzhu stuck to the treaty terms, and advocated to wait until everything was ready to destroy the Song dynasty in a very short time. And in that case, in the later 20 years, there were few wars between the two empires, which was positive to their development of economy and culture.

In October 1148, Wuzhu died of illness.

== Family ==
Parents:

- Father: Emperor Taizu of Jin (August 1, 1068 – September 19, 1123),
- Mother: Consort Yuan of the Wugulun clan (元妃 烏古論氏)

Consort and issue:

- Princess Consort of Liang, of the Tudan clan (梁王妃 徒單氏)
  - Wanyan Heng, Prince of Rui (芮王完顏亨), 1st son
- Secondary Consort Zhao, of the Zhao clan (次妃 趙氏; b.1111), personal name Yuanzhu (圓珠)
  - Wanyan Wei (完顏偉), 2nd son
- Concubine Chen, of the Chen clan (妾 陳氏), personal name Yan (豔)
- Unknown:
  - Princess Shoukang (壽康公主), personal name Puci (蒲刺), 1st daughter
  - Wanyan Xinian (完顏習捻), 2nd daughter
    - married Shao Heya (稍喝押)
  - Princess of Yong'an County (永安縣主), 3rd daughter
    - Married Heseri Zhining, Prince of Jinyuan (紇石烈志寧爵 金源郡王) of the Heseri clan
