= Consort Hui =

Consort Hui may refer to:

== China ==
- Empress Zhenshun (died 737), concubine of Emperor Xuanzong of Tang
- Madame Huarui (c. 940–976), concubine of Meng Chang (emperor of Later Shu)
- Empress Tudan (Digunai's wife) (died 1170), empress of the Jin dynasty
- Consort Hui, two consorts (died 1670 and 1732) of the Kangxi Emperor
- Imperial Noble Consort Shushen (1859–1904), concubine of the Tongzhi Emperor

== Korea ==
- Hui-bi Yun (died 1380), consort of Chunghye of Goryeo
- Royal Noble Consort Huibin Jang (1659–1701), consort of Sukjong of Joseon
