= Wanyan Zongjun =

Father of Emperor Xizong of Jin

Wanyan Zongjun 完顏宗峻
- Born: Shengguo 繩果
- Consorts: Empress Huizhao
- Issue: Emperor Xizong of Jin; Wanyan Yuan; Wanyan Chala; Princess E Lady Wanyan
Posthumous name
- Emperor Yungong Kerang Xiaode Xuangong Yousheng Jingxuan (允恭克讓孝德玄功佑聖景宣皇帝)
Temple name
- Huizong (徽宗)
- Father: Emperor Taizu of Jin
- Mother: Empress Shengmu

Wanyan Zongjun (Chinese: 完顏宗峻), Jurchen name Shengguo (繩果), was an imperial prince of China's Jurchen-led Jin dynasty. He was the second or third son of the founding ruler Emperor Taizu with his first empress, Empress Shengmu.

There is no record of his birth year, except one mentioning the birth of his half-brother Wanyan Zongyao which said his birth year should have been before Wanyan Zongyao. In the sixth year of Tianfu (1121), he was injured in the war to take Zhongjing and save Xijing.

At that time, the Jin Dynasty practiced the different hereditary system of succession, in which the brother would inherit his elder brother's inheritance.

After Wanyan Dan became emperor, he was accorded the temple name Huizong (徽宗).

In some books it's mentioned that Wanyan Zongjun shares his birthday with his eldest son.

== Family ==
Parents

- Father: Emperor Taizu of Jin (August 1, 1068 – September 19, 1123)
- Mother: Empress Shengmu of Tangkuo clan (聖穆皇后 唐括氏)

Wives

- Empress Huizhao, of the Pucha clan (惠昭皇后 蒲察氏)
  - Wanyan Dan, Emperor Xizong (金熙宗完顏亶, 28 February 1119 – 9 January 1150), first son
- Unknown concubine:
  - Wanyan Yuan, Prince Zuo (胙王 (完顏元; d. 1149), second son
  - Wanyan Chala (完顏查剌), held title of Anwujun Jiedushi (安武军节度使), third son
  - Princess E (鄂国公主), first daughter
  - Lady Wanyan (完颜氏), second daughter.
