= Wanyan Liang =

Emperor of Jin from 1150 to 1161

Wanyan Liang 完顔亮
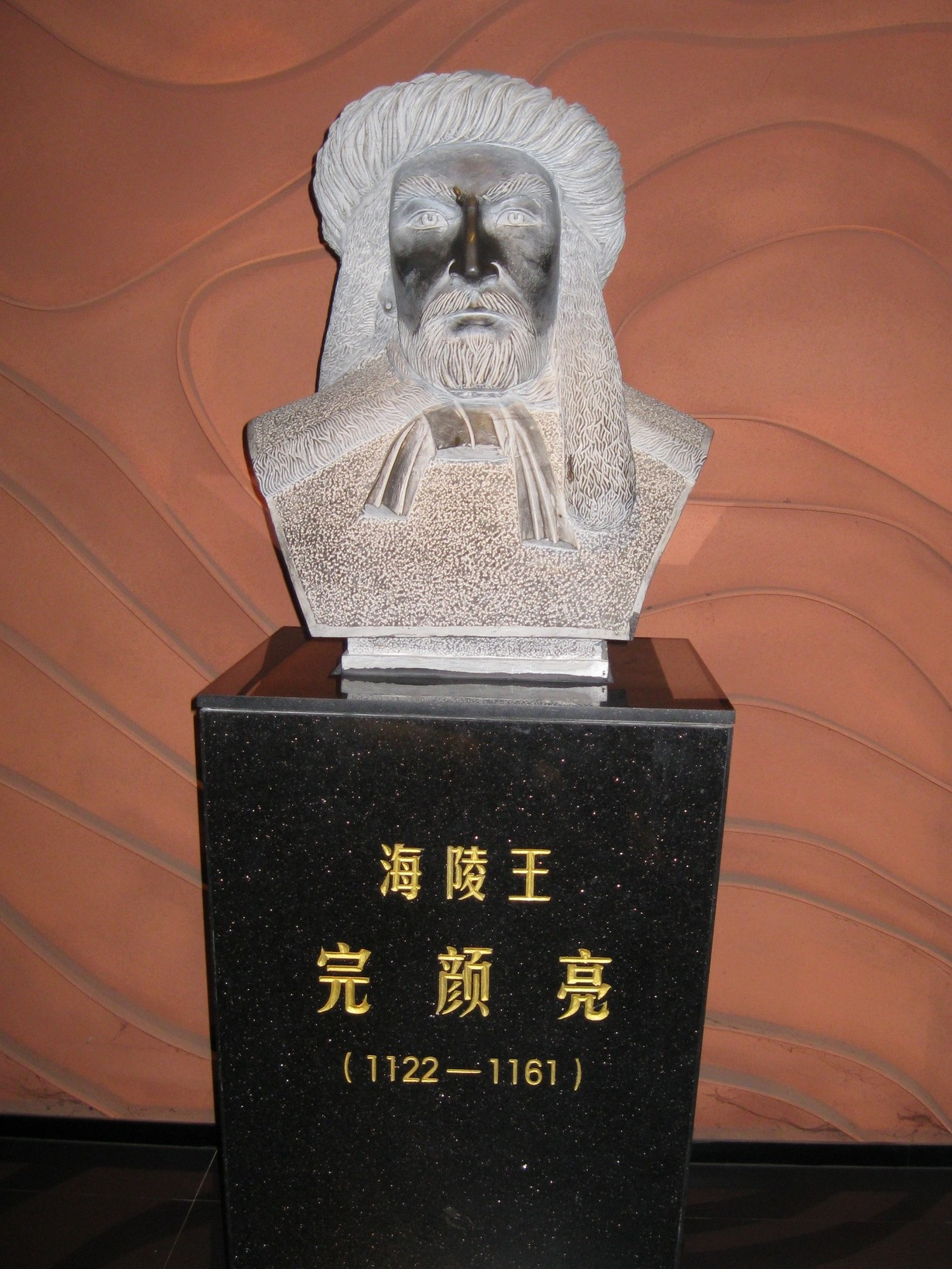

Emperor of the Jin dynasty
- Reign: 9 January 1150 – 15 December 1161
- Predecessor: Emperor Xizong
- Successor: Emperor Shizong
- Born: 24 February 1122
- Died: 15 December 1161 (aged 39)
- Burial: Tomb of the Prince of Hailing (海陵王陵, in present-day Fangshan District, Beijing)
- Spouse: Empress Tudan others
- Issue: See § Family
Names
- sinicised name: Wanyan Liang (完顔亮); Jurchen name: Digunai (迪古乃); Courtesy name: Yuangong (元功)
Era dates
- Tiande (天德): 1149–1153; Zhenyuan (貞元): 1153–1156; Zhenglong (正隆): 1156–1161
Posthumous name
- Prince Yang of Hailing (海陵煬王) (revoked in 1181)
- House: Wanyan
- Dynasty: Jin
- Father: Wanyan Zonggan
- Mother: Lady Da

Wanyan Liang
- Chinese: 金海陵王
Transcriptions
Standard Mandarin
- Hanyu Pinyin: Jīn Hǎilíng Wáng

Digunai
- Chinese: 迪古乃
Transcriptions
Standard Mandarin
- Hanyu Pinyin: Dígǔnǎi

Wanyan Liang
- Traditional Chinese: 完顏亮
- Simplified Chinese: 完颜亮
Transcriptions
Standard Mandarin
- Hanyu Pinyin: Wányán Liàng

Digunai (24 February 1122 – 15 December 1161), also known by his sinicised name Wanyan Liang and his formal title Prince of Hailing (海陵王, Hǎilíng Wáng), was the fourth emperor of the Jurchen-led Jin dynasty of China. He was the second son of Wanyan Zonggan, the eldest son of the dynastic founder Wanyan Aguda (Emperor Taizu). He came to power in 1150 after overthrowing and murdering his predecessor, Emperor Xizong, in a coup d'état. During his reign, he moved the Jin capital from Shangjing (present-day Acheng District, Harbin, Heilongjiang Province) to Yanjing (present-day Beijing), and introduced a policy of sinicisation. In 1161, after the Jin dynasty lost the Battle of Caishi against the Southern Song dynasty, Digunai's subordinates rebelled against him and assassinated him. After his death, even though he ruled as an emperor during his lifetime, he was posthumously demoted to the status of a prince – "Prince Yang of Hailing" (海陵煬王) – in 1162 by his successor, Emperor Shizong. However, in 1181, Emperor Shizong further posthumously demoted him to the status of a commoner, hence he is also known as the "Commoner of Hailing" (海陵庶人).

== Background ==
Digunai was the second son of Woben (斡本; also known as Wanyan Zonggan 完顏宗幹), a son of Aguda (Emperor Taizu), the founder of the Jin dynasty. His mother, Lady Da, came from a prestiguous family of Balhae descent. Emperor Taizu's brother and successor, Emperor Taizong, started a series of wars between the Jin and Song dynasties. During the reign of Emperor Xizong, who succeeded Emperor Taizong, Wanyan Zonggan was described as the most influential man in the Jin imperial court.

Digunai, who was an army marshal under Emperor Xizong, overthrew the emperor in a coup d'état in 1150 and replaced him. Having seized the throne through illegitimate means, Digunai was suspicious of other members of the Jurchen aristocracy, and, immediately upon taking the throne, started eliminating potential rivals. He ordered the massacre of the descendants of Emperor Taizong, so as to secure the position of the lineage of Emperor Taizu, to which he belonged.

== Reign ==
Digunai capitalised on the Jin dynasty's "superior status" vis-à-vis the Song dynasty after its victory over the latter in 1141, and sought to make the Jin dynasty the sole Chinese empire. To legitimise himself as a sinicised ruler, in 1150 he lifted Emperor Taizong's prohibition of wearing Han Chinese dress, and adopted an array of Han Chinese practices and institutions, such as holding of sacrificial ceremonies in the northern and southern suburbs of his capital in 1149 (cf. ceremonies conducted at the Temple of Earth and Temple of Heaven in Beijing during the Ming and Qing dynasties), the use of the imperial carriage in 1151, a system of feudal rights in 1156, and the Song dynasty's shan-hu (山呼) style of court ceremonies in 1157. Digunai also introduced the imperial examination system in 1150 and set up the Imperial Academy in the following year. In his pursuit for greater sinicisation and the desire to acquire the Mandate of Heaven, Digunai moved his imperial court from Shangjing (present-day Acheng District, Harbin, Heilongjiang Province to Yanjing (present-day Beijing) in 1153. In 1157, he ordered the destruction of the imperial palaces in Shangjing.

In contrast to the traditions of the Tang and Song dynasties, which rarely imposed corporal punishment on the members of the society's educated elites, Digunai continued the Khitan and Jurchen tradition of floggings with gusto, sometimes enjoying personally watching his subjects – including chancellors, censors, and a princess – beaten with poles or whips.

== Assassination ==
Digunai's attempts to conquer the Southern Song dynasty and unify China under the Jin dynasty's rule ended in failure when his fleet was defeated by Song forces at the battles of Tangdao and Caishi in 1161. Many of his officers deserted and in some places the people rebelled against him. In an attempt to ebb desertions, he issued a harsh order decreeing "If a soldier deserts, his puliyan (squad leader) is executed; if a puliyan deserts, his mouke (company commander) is executed; if a mouke deserts, his meng'an (regimental commander) is executed; if a meng'an deserts, his zongguan (army commander) is executed." He ordered the army to cross the Yangtze at Guazhou in three days, with the penalty for retreat being death. Several of his subordinates, led by Yelü Yuanyi (耶律元宜), the commander of the West Zhejiang Front, conspired against him and assassinated him on 15 December 1161 in a military camp near the Yangtze River. Digunai's cousin, Wulu, who had led a rebellion against Digunai's rule, was proclaimed the new emperor.

== Family ==
- Empress Tudan (徒單皇后; d.1170), of the Tudan clan
  - Wanyan Guangying, Crown Prince (太子 完顏光英, 1150 – 1161), 2nd son
- First Consort (元妃), personal name Nailahu (奈剌忽)
- First Consort, of the Da clan of Bohai (元妃 大氏),
  - Wanyan Yuanshou, Prince of Chong (崇王 完顏元壽, d. 1151), 1st son
- Noble Consort, of the Tangkuo clan (貴妃 唐括氏), personal name Dingge (定哥)
- Consort Li, of the Tangukuo clan (麗妃唐括氏), personal name Shigge (石哥)
  - Wanyan Shensi'abu, Prince of Su (宿王 完顏矧思阿補, 1156 – 1158), 3rd son
- Consort Chen, of the Xiao clan (宸妃 蕭氏)
- Consort Li, of the Yelü clan (麗妃 耶律氏)
- Consort Zhao, of the Pucha clan (昭妃 蒲察氏), personal name Alihu (阿里虎)
- Consort Zhao, of the Wanyan clan (昭妃 淑妃完顏氏), personal name Alan (阿懶)
- Consort Rou, of the Yelü clan (柔妃 耶律氏)
- Consort Zhao, of the Wanyan clan (昭妃完顏氏), personal name Shigu (什古)
- Consort Shu, of the Wanyan clan (淑妃完顏氏), personal name Pula (蒲剌)
- Consort Shu, of the Wanyan clan (淑妃完顏氏), personal name Shigu'er (師姑兒)
- Consort Gui, of the Wanyan clan (貴妃 完顏氏), personal name Shaliguzhen (莎里古真)
- Consort Zhao, of the Wanyan clan (昭妃), personal name Chongjie (重節)
- Consort Li, of Tanguko clan (麗妃唐括氏), personal name Puluhuzhi (魯胡只)
- Zhaoyuan, of the Yelü clan (昭媛 耶律氏)
- Xiuyi, of the Gao clan (修儀 高氏)
- Cairen, of the Nan clan (才人 南氏)
  - Wanyan Guangyang, Prince of Teng (滕王 完顏廣陽), 4th son
- Lady, of the Pucha clan (蒲察氏), personal name Chacha (叉察)
- Unknown:
  - Princess of Rong (榮國公主), personal name Henü (合女)
    - married Tushan Sila (單術斯剌)
  - Unnamed Princess
    - married Xiao Yu's son (蕭玉)
  - Unnamed Princess
    - married Wugulun Yi (烏古論誼)

== See also ==
- History of Beijing
