= Guaizi Ma =

The Guaizi Ma (simplified Chinese: 拐子马; traditional Chinese: 拐子馬; pinyin: guǎizi mǎ) is a military formation that was allegedly used by the Jin army when they invaded Southern China during the Song dynasty period of Chinese history (960–1279). It was once believed to involve the linking together of three cavalrymen with a hide rope to enhance their fighting capabilities. Later scholars believe that the Guaizi Ma was in fact a Song military cavalry tactic or the name of a particular unit of the Song army.

== Song dynasty records ==
Also known as the Guaizi Zhen (拐子陣) or Guaizima Zhen (拐子馬陳), the Guaizi Ma was a troop deployment that involved left and right cavalry wings. There are also contemporary references to the tactic which use the terms Dong Xi Guaizi Zhen (東西拐子陣) and Guaizi Cheng (拐子城) as well as Liang Guaizi' (两拐子). The first reference to the Guaizi Ma appears in Yue Ke's (岳珂) E Wang Xingshi Biannian (鄂王行实编年) or Account of the Lord of E's life published in the final years of the Southern Song dynasty. The book follows Wang Ruohai’s (汪若海) established principle that "three soldiers become five when roped together with a leather thong", believing this to be the reason that the Jin army was able to triumph in every encounter with their enemies. Yue Ke's book states that in 1140, the tenth year of the Shaoxing era: "During the Battle of Yancheng General Yue Fei was able to break through a weak point in the Jin line" whilst the History of Song records: "Wuzhu's army were strong and heavily armored with three men roped together by a leather thong." This view of the Guaizi Ma persisted until the time of the Qing dynasty (1644–1911), yet no mention of the tactic is made in either the military records or biography sections (including that of Wuzhu) in the History of Jin.

== Later analysis ==
A work written during the early years of the Qing dynasty refutes the above description on the grounds that there is no logic in the Guaizi Ma as previously described. The book records: "For northern horsemen the head on charge was their primary tactic. If three horses were roped together in this way their strength would be uneven and result in erratic movement, as would be the bravery of the three cavalrymen involved with some brave and others timid. The soldiers differing levels of fatigue would also affect their performance. Moreover, why would Wu Shu's army, skilled as they were as individual horsemen, agree to be restricted in such a way? On many occasions it is known that the Jin armies were able to advance in even formation sweeping all before them and leaving the Song armies unable to put up any resistance. Finally the name itself is clearly absurd for such a tactic."

The Wujing Zongyao or Collection of the Most Important Military Strategies calls the Guaizi Ma a "South Eastern (i.e. Song) Guaizi Ma disposition of troops" and a large scale formation with left and right flanks of cavalry. Based on these sources, the Guaizi Ma was actually a Song cavalry formation and to say that it was a tactic of Wu Shu is mistaken. Historian Deng Guangming (邓广铭) goes on to point out: "The name Guaizi Ma was used for one of the Song army’s operational units, the Hebei Qian Army (河北签军) and the so-called "Victory at Zhuzhian Town" which smashed Wu Shu's army did not actually happen. Yue Fei's most northern victory was at Xiaoshang Bridge (小商桥, 12 kilometers south of Linying County, Hebei Province) where Yang Zaixing (杨再兴/楊再興) died in battle."

Liang Dingming's (梁鼎铭/梁鼎銘) 1956 painting Yue Fei’s Major Victory (岳飞大破拐子马图/岳飛大破拐子馬圖) shows Song infantry hacking at the feet of Jin cavalry horses with long handled pikes.

This article is based on a translation of 拐子马 in Chinese Wikipedia.

== See also ==
- Military history of the Song dynasty
- Jin–Song wars
- Battle of Yancheng
- Battle of Tangdao
- Battle of Caishi
- Jingkang Incident

== Notes ==
1. Yue Ke was Yue Fei’s grandson. Lord of E was Yue Fei’s posthumous title granted by Emperor Xiaozong of Song in 1162 CE.
2. 三人为伍，以皮索相连.
3. In Chinese, Guaizi ma literally means "to cripple a horse", without any reference to "rope" or "cavalry".
