= Ba-zha =

Chinese agricultural rite and folk deity

Ba-zha (Chinese: 八蜡; pinyin: Bāzhà), also romanized as Ba Cha or Pa Cha, is a name used for an ancient Chinese agricultural rite and a deity in Chinese folk religion. The ancient Ba-zha ceremony, also called the "Eight Sacrifices", honoured eight groups of gods and spirits connected with farming. In later folk religion, Ba Zha was worshipped as a deity believed to protect crops from locusts and other harmful insects.

== Historical ritual ==
The Ba-zha ceremony was held at the end of the agricultural year to thank the gods and spirits believed to help farmers. The Book of Rites (礼记), in the chapter "Jiao Te Sheng" (郊特牲), describes the Great Zha ceremony (大蜡) as a sacrifice held in the twelfth month. It honoured beings and things that had helped people grow crops, including agricultural gods, animals, and waterworks.

The Han dynasty scholar Zheng Xuan (郑玄) identified the eight sacrifices as the First Agriculturalist (先啬), usually identified with Shennong; the Overseer of Agriculture (司啬), identified with Houji; farmers (农); field boundaries (邮表畷); cats and tigers (猫虎), which protected crops from rats and wild boars; dikes (坊); water channels (水庸); and insects (昆虫). The inclusion of insects was disputed by later scholars.

The list was not accepted by all later scholars. The Song dynasty thinker Zhang Zai (张载) argued that harmful insects should not be worshipped and replaced insects with the "hundred grains" (百种), meaning the seeds of different crops. Later commentators also disagreed about whether cats and tigers should count as one group or two. The place of insects in the eight sacrifices therefore remained a subject of debate.

The Book of Rites also records a prayer asking that the earth remain in its place, water return to its channels, insects not swarm, and plants return to the marshes (土反其宅，水归其壑，昆虫毋作，草木归其泽). The prayer shows the importance of protecting farmland from floods, insects, and other natural dangers.

The origins of the Zha ceremony were explained differently in ancient writings. The Book of Rites attributes its beginning to Yiqi (伊耆氏), a figure later identified by different commentators with Emperor Yao or Shennong. The Tang dynasty scholar Sima Zhen, in his Sanhuang Benji (三皇本纪), credits Shennong with establishing the ceremony after teaching people how to farm.

The Zha sacrifice (蜡祭) was originally different from the La sacrifice (腊祭). The Zha ceremony honoured agricultural gods and spirits, while the La sacrifice was mainly held for ancestors and household gods. The two ceremonies became mixed during later periods, and their names were sometimes used for the same year-end rites. They also formed part of the older traditions connected with the Laba Festival.

== In folklore ==
In later Chinese folk religion, Ba Zha was regarded as a god who could protect crops from locusts, grasshoppers, and other insects. Jeremy Roberts, in Chinese Mythology A to Z, describes Ba Zha as a spirit known as the "Great King Ba Zha". He has a human upper body with a bird's beak, claws, and wings, while his lower body resembles a bell. He is said to catch harmful insects with a magical liquid and sometimes carries a sword, mallet, or banner used to control them.

Roberts also records a Mongolian legend about Ba Zha Yeh, who lived in a remote valley filled with wolves, scorpions, locusts, and other dangerous creatures. None of them attacked or harmed him. In another custom described by Roberts, travelling musicians performed prayers and music during annual ceremonies for Ba Zha. Villagers received charms to place above their doors for protection.

During the Qing dynasty, Yuan Mei recorded a story about Ba Zha in Zi Bu Yu (子不语). In the story, a young boy suffers from a serious illness, and a woman who serves as a spirit medium is asked to find its cause. She explains that insects and fish are under the control of the Ba Zha God and advises the family to pray at the shrine of General Liu Meng. The boy is said to recover after the family follows her advice.

Ba Zha was also linked with General Liu Meng (刘猛将军), another god believed to protect crops from locusts. In some places, people worshipped the two together or treated them as the same deity. However, the Ba-zha ritual and the worship of Liu Meng had different origins. Liu Meng became widely worshipped as a locust god during the Song and Yuan periods and gained official recognition under the Qing dynasty.

== Temples and worship ==
Ba-zha temples (八蜡庙) were built in different parts of China. They were places where farmers and local officials prayed for protection against locusts and other pests. Some were called Insect King Temples (虫王庙), reflecting their role in protecting farmland.

The Imperial Gazetteer of Shengjing (钦定盛京通志) records a Ba-zha temple in Jilin. It stood in the southeastern part of the city and was commonly called the Insect King Temple (虫王庙). The building had a main hall with three rooms, side rooms, and an entrance gate.

Ba-zha worship also reached Taiwan. A Qing dynasty gazetteer records that Song Yongqing (宋永清), the magistrate of Fengshan County, built a Ba-zha shrine near Turtle Mountain (龟山) in 1706 after a locust plague. The shrine was used for prayers against further damage to crops.

The Ba-zha rite was removed from the Qing state's official sacrifices in 1745, during the reign of the Qianlong Emperor. Local communities continued to practise it, however, and Ba-zha temples remained in use. Worship of General Liu Meng was also common, and in some areas the two gods were honoured in the same temples or their identities became confused.

Ba-zha temples also appeared in Xinjiang as farming expanded during the Qing dynasty. In 1766, the Qianlong Emperor ordered officials in Ili to establish places of worship for Ba Zha and General Liu Meng. The temples were later built in Huiyuan, where the two deities were worshipped separately. A record from 1776 describes eight tablets in the Ba-zha temple, each representing one of the agricultural gods or spirits. No statues were installed. The temple of General Liu Meng stood to its west.

In Shandong, Ba-zha temples were found in several parts of the Jinan region. They were used for prayers during locust disasters. The worship of Ba Zha was already established there before that of General Liu Meng, but Liu Meng's worship grew after receiving Qing government support. The two traditions often existed together, and local people sometimes confused their identities.

== Local traditions ==
In Hangzhou, a lane called Chongbazhazi Lane (虫八蜡子巷) has been linked in local tradition to the worship of an insect deity. One explanation connects the name to the old practice of worshipping at Insect Ba-zha Temples. Another explanation, recorded by Zhong Yulong in Shuo Hangzhou (说杭州), traces the name to an earlier street called Bazuo Si Lane (八作司巷), named after a government office responsible for construction work during the Southern Song dynasty.

In Tianjin, a folk performance called the Xiaochehui (小车会, "Small Cart Festival") developed around the Insect Ba-zha Temple in Beicang. The custom dates from the late Qing dynasty and is performed during the Spring Festival and Lantern Festival. Performers dress as characters from the traditional story Shi Gong An (施公案), including Huang Tianba and Zhang Guilan. They use a decorated cart, music, and dance to act out the story. The Beicang Xiaochehui was added to Tianjin's intangible cultural heritage list in 2006.
