= Yang Zaixing =

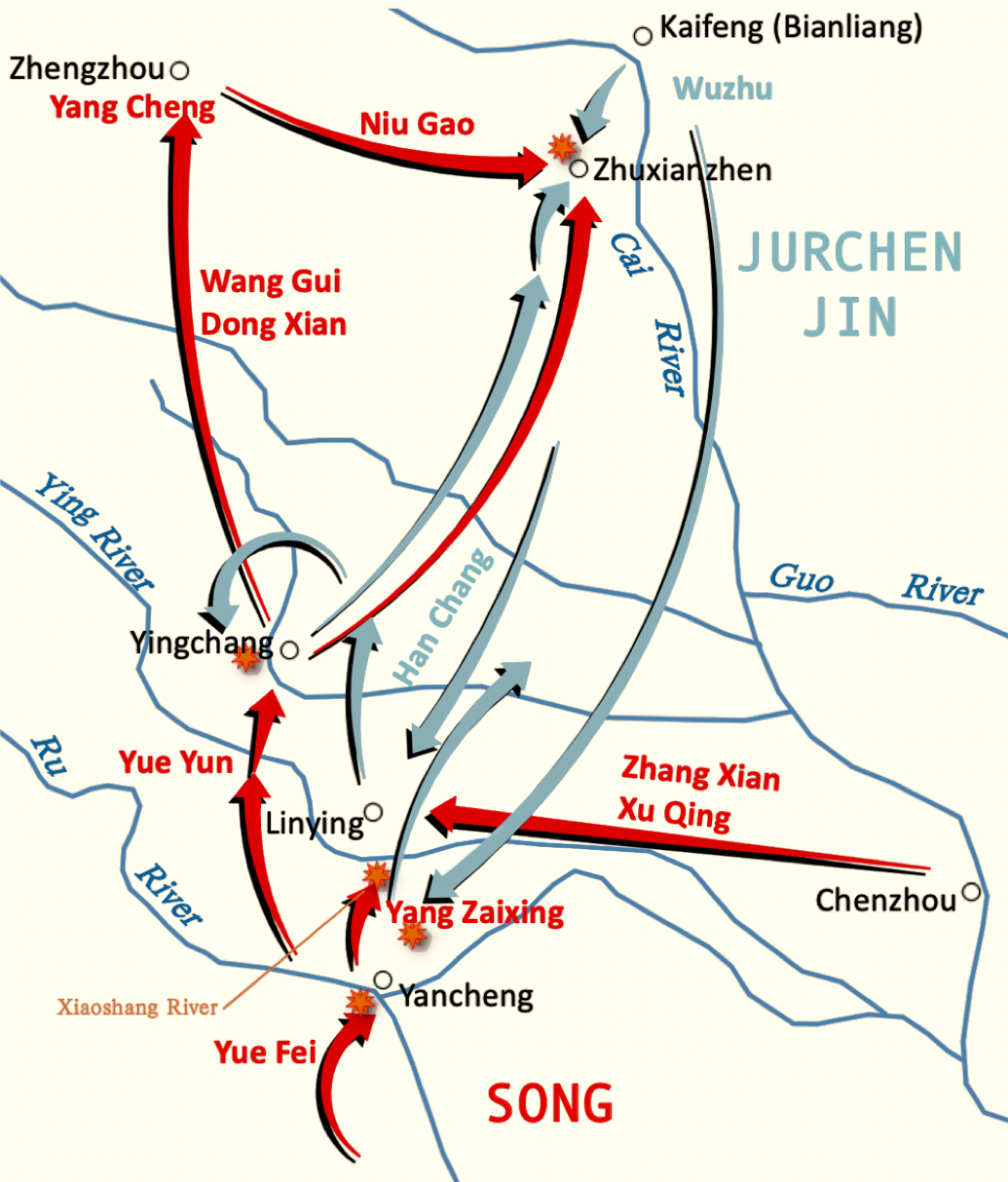
Map showing the location of XIaoshang River where Yang fought his last battle.

Yang Zaixing (simplified Chinese: 杨再兴; traditional Chinese: 楊再興; pinyin: Yáng Zàixīng, died 21 August 1140) was a Song dynasty general under Yue Fei, known for his ferocity in battles. He fought against the Jin dynasty in the Jin–Song Wars. His heroic death in the battle of Yancheng—where he led 300 cavalry to kill an estimated 2000 enemies before succumbing to hundreds of arrows piercing his body—made him a legendary figure still remembered today. The site of his last battle, near the Xiaoshang River (小商河; a tributary of Ying River), in modern Linying County, Henan, houses a mausoleum and temple dedicated to him.

In the 18th-century novel General Yue Fei (說岳全傳), Yang Zaixing is said to be a descendant of the 10th/11th-century Generals of the Yang Family, also known for their bravery defending the Song dynasty against hostile foreign powers.

In Jin Yong's Condor Trilogy novels (1957–1961), the stories' antagonist Yang Kang and protagonist Yang Guo are said to be Yang Zaixing's descendants.
