= Emperor Xizong of Jin =

Emperor of Jin from 1135 to 1150

Emperor Xizong of Jin 金熙宗

Emperor of the Jin dynasty
- Reign: 10 February 1135 – 9 January 1150
- Predecessor: Emperor Taizong
- Successor: Wanyan Liang
- Born: 28 February 1119
- Died: 9 January 1150 (aged 30)
- Burial: Si Mausoleum (思陵; in present-day Fangshan District, Beijing)
- Spouse: Empress Daoping others
- Issue: See § Family
Names
- Sinicised name: Wanyan Dan (完顏亶); Jurchen name: Hela (合剌)
Era dates
- Tianhui (天會): 1135–1138; Tianjuan (天眷): 1138–1141; Huangtong (皇統): 1141–1149
Regnal name
- Emperor Chongtian Tidao Qinming Wenwu Shengde (崇天體道欽明文武聖德皇帝)
Posthumous name
- Prince Donghun (東昏王) (1150–1161); Emperor Wuling (武靈皇帝) (1161–1179); Emperor Hongji Zuanwu Zhuangjing Xiaocheng (弘基纘武莊靖孝成皇帝) (after 1179)
Temple name
- Minzong (閔宗) (1161–1187); Xizong (熙宗) (after 1187)
- House: Wanyan
- Dynasty: Jin
- Father: Wanyan Zongjun
- Mother: Lady Pucha

Emperor Xizong of Jin
- Chinese: 金熙宗
Transcriptions
Standard Mandarin
- Hanyu Pinyin: Jīn Xīzōng

Hela
- Traditional Chinese: 合剌
- Simplified Chinese: 合剌
Transcriptions
Standard Mandarin
- Hanyu Pinyin: Hélá

Wanyan Dan
- Traditional Chinese: 完顏亶
- Simplified Chinese: 完颜亶
Transcriptions
Standard Mandarin
- Hanyu Pinyin: Wányán Dǎn

Emperor Xizong of Jin (28 February 1119 – 9 January 1150), personal name Hela, sinicised name Wanyan Dan, was the third emperor of the Jurchen-led Jin dynasty of China. He reigned for about 15 years from 1135 to 1150. During his reign, the Jin dynasty launched several military campaigns against the Han-led Southern Song dynasty in southern China.

== Early life ==
Hela was the eldest son of Shengguo (繩果; also known as Wanyan Zongjun, 完顏宗峻), the eldest son of Aguda (Emperor Taizu), the founder and first emperor of the Jin dynasty. His mother was Lady Pucha (蒲察氏), whom he posthumously honoured as "Empress Huizhao" (惠昭皇后). When Emperor Taizu died in 1123, the throne was passed on to his younger brother, Wuqimai (Emperor Taizong). Wanyan Zonghan and Wanyan Xiyin, who used to be Emperor Taizu's chief advisers, convinced Emperor Taizong to designate Hela as his heir apparent (anban bojilie; 諳班勃極烈) in 1132, so Hela became the new emperor in 1135 when Emperor Taizong died.

== Wars against the Southern Song dynasty ==
In 1137, Emperor Xizong abolished the Qi kingdom, a vassal state of the Jin dynasty ruled by Liu Yu (劉豫), a former Song dynasty official. The Jin dynasty started peace negotiations with the Southern Song dynasty. In 1139, the Jin and Song dynasties arrived at a treaty, with the latter agreeing to be a tributary vassal state under the former. In return, the Jin dynasty returned control of Henan and Shaanxi provinces to the Song dynasty. However, in 1140, Emperor Xizong decided to wage war against the Song dynasty so he ordered the general Wanyan Zongbi to lead Jin forces to attack and seize back Henan and Shaanxi. In 1141, Wanyan Zongbi and his army were defeated by Song forces led by Yue Fei and Han Shizhong; the Jin dynasty agreed to negotiate for peace again with the Song dynasty.

== Internal politics ==
Emperor Xizong was very fond of Han culture because of the influence of his adoptive father, Wanyan Zonggan, so he reformed the political institutions and modelled them after Han Chinese ones, while at the same time encouraging talented Han Chinese to serve in his government. In 1136, Emperor Xizong ordered Wanyan Zonggan, Wanyan Zongpan (完顏宗磐) and Wanyan Zonghan to take charge of reforming the government and creating the Three Departments system.

Emperor Xizong abolished the traditional bojilie (勃極烈) system that he inherited from his predecessors. The bojilie system allowed the Jurchen ruler to choose an heir apparent from among male relatives in the same generation as him, usually his brothers. However, Emperor Taizong, who succeeded his brother Emperor Taizu, made an exception when he chose Emperor Xizong (Emperor Taizu's grandson) as his heir apparent instead of choosing from among his sons. Wanyan Zongpan, the eldest son of Emperor Taizong, was very unhappy when the bojilie system was abolished because this meant that he would have no chance to become emperor.

Between 1138 and 1139, Wanyan Zongpan tried to seize power and start a rebellion but was defeated and executed. Since then, the political arena was dominated by Wanyan Zonghan, Wanyan Zonggan and Wanyan Zongbi; Emperor Xizong had little or no say in politics. After Wanyan Zongbi died in 1148, Emperor Xizong gained an opportunity to participate in politics, but his wife, Empress Daoping, started to interfere in politics and she wielded significant influence. Emperor Xizong's two sons, Wanyan Ji'an (完顏濟安) and Wanyan Daoji (完顏道濟), died in 1143 and 1144 respectively. Emperor Xizong felt depressed by the loss of his sons that he developed an addiction to alcohol and started neglecting state affairs. He also became more violent and ruthless, and started killing people indiscriminately. One of his victims was Ambaghai, a Mongol chieftain and great-granduncle of Genghis Khan.

Emperor Xizong was overthrown and murdered by his chancellor, Digunai, and other court officials in a coup d'état on 9 January 1150.

== Family ==
- Empress Daoping, of the Peiman clan (悼平皇后 裴滿氏, d. 1149)
  - Wanyan Ji'an, Crown Prince Yingdao (英悼太子 完顏濟安, 23 March 1142 – 13 January 1143), 1st son
  - Princess of Dai State (代國公主), 3rd daughter
    - Married Wogula (斡骨剌; d. 1150)
- Consort Samao (妃撒卯), of a certain clan
- Worthy Consort, of a certain clan (賢妃)
  - Wanyan Daoji, Prince of Wei (魏王 完顏道濟, d. 1144), 2nd son
- Consort De, of the Wugulungan clan (德妃 烏古論氏)
- Consort, of the Jiagu clan (妃夾谷氏)
- Consort, of the Zhang clan (妃張氏)
- Consort, of the Peiman clan (妃裴滿氏)
- Consort, of the Zhao clan (妃趙氏), personal name Jingu (金姑)
- Consort, of the Zhao clan (妃趙氏), personal name Saiyue (賽月)
- Consort, of the Zhao clan (妃趙氏), personal name Feiyan (飛燕)
- Consort, of the Zhao clan (妃趙氏), personal name Yuqiang (玉嬙)
- Consort, of the Zhao clan (妃趙氏), personal name Yupan (玉盤)
- Consort, of the Zhao clan (妃趙氏), personal name Jinnu (金奴)
- Consort, of the Zhao clan (妃趙氏), personal name Chuanzhu (串珠)
- Consort of the Zhao clan (妃趙氏), personal nane Jinyin (金印)
- Consort of the Zhao clan (妃趙氏), personal name Tanxiang (檀香)
- Unknown:
  - Princess of Zheng (鄭國公主), 1st daughter
    - married Pucha Dingshou (蒲察鼎壽) and had issue (1 daughter)
  - Princess of Ji (冀國公主), 2nd daughter
  - Unnamed Princess, 4th daughter
  - Princess Supreme of Liang (梁國大長公主), 5th daughter
  - Princess of Shen (沈國公主), 6th daughter
    - married Tushan Yi (徒單繹) and had issue ( 1 daughter)
