= Empress Tudan (Digunai's wife) =

Empress Tudan 徒單皇后

Empress consort of the Jin dynasty
- Tenure: 1150 – 1161
- Predecessor: Empress Daoping
- Successor: Empress Mingde
- Died: 1170; Shangjing
- Spouse: Digunai, Prince of Hailing
- Issue: Alubu
Posthumous name
- None
- Clan: Tudan (by birth); Wanyan (by marriage)
- Dynasty: Jin
- Father: Xieye

Empress Tudan
- Traditional Chinese: 徒單皇后
- Simplified Chinese: 徒单皇后
Transcriptions
Standard Mandarin
- Hanyu Pinyin: Túdān huánghòu

Empress Tudan (d. 1170) was the empress of the fourth emperor of the Jurchen-led Chinese Jin dynasty, Digunai. After his murder, she was demoted to commoner status. She was one of three Jin empresses from the Tudan clan.

== Biography ==
Tudan was the daughter of Xieye, a prominent official of the Jin Dynasty. She initially entered Digunai's harem with the title Consort of Qi State (Chinese: 岐國妃). She was promoted and received the title Consort Hui (Chinese: 惠妃) in 1150, before being elevated to empress later that year when her son Alubu was born. After this, the number of women in Digunai's harem increased, and the Empress fell out of favour. At one point, two officials' wives were sent to serve the Empress, and the debts of one of them were cancelled in return.

Empress Tudan's family used her position to extort property and wealth from other officials. When a minor wife of her father, Huta (忽撻), clashed with his main wife, Wulu (兀魯), investigators did not dare contradict Huta, who enjoyed Empress Tudan's particular favour. Wulu was thus killed, and even when Digunai found that she had been unfairly treated, Xieye's punishment did not stick, and he was quickly reinstated and promoted.

In 1161, Empress Tudan and her son, the crown prince, accompanied Digunai to Nanjing near modern Kaifeng, from where he launched attacks against the Song. Empress Tudan remained in Nanjing, but when Digunai was killed, her son was murdered, and she fled to her mother-in-law's home in Zhongdu. Digunai's successor, Emperor Shizong, reportedly took pity on her and allowed her to return to her parents' home in Shangjing, bestowing a yearly allowance of 2,000 strings of cash on her and specifying that all grain for her servants be provided from official stores. Empress Tudan died in 1170.

== Family ==
- Father: Xieye (? – 1154) (斜也), sinicised name Tudan Gong (徒單恭)
- Husband: Digunai, Prince of Hailing (24 February 1122 – 15 December 1161)
  - Son: Alubu (1150 – 1161) (阿魯補), sinicised name Wanyan Guangying (完顏光英)
