= Liu Qi (Song dynasty) =

Chinese scholar (died 1117)

Liu Qi (simplified Chinese: 刘跂; traditional Chinese: 劉跂; pinyin: Liú Qí; birth date unknown; died 1117; courtesy name: Sili 斯立) was a scholar of the Song dynasty. He was the son of the official Liu Zhi (劉摯).

== Life ==
Liu Qi was a native of Dongguang (東光), in present-day Hebei province. In 1079 (the second year of the Yuanfeng era), he passed the jinshi examination and was appointed as a teacher in Bozhou (亳州). At the beginning of the Yuanyou era (1086–1094), he was transferred to serve as a teacher in Caozhou (曹州). In his later years, he lived in seclusion in Dongping (東平), avoiding contact with others, and few people ever saw his face. According to Su Shi (1037–1101), he and Liu Sili once discovered an old manuscript of Poetic Collection of Vice Director Du (Du yuanwai shiji 杜员外诗集) in a leaf book of a family from Guancheng. Liu Qi authored a work titled Xueyi ji 學易集/学易集 (8 juan; translatable as “Collection from the Studies of the Changes”) and other works.

== Works ==
In the Bibliography of the Hanyu Da Zidian (HYDZD) are listed the following works and editions:

- Yuyou zhuan 玉友传 (Jiu xiaoshuo 旧小说)
- Xiari ji 暇日记 (Shuofu 说郛 - Wanweishantang ben 宛委山堂本)
- Xueyi ji 学易集 (Juzhenban congshu 聚珍版丛书)

== Bibliography ==
- Zheng Jinsheng, Nalini Kirk, Paul D. Buell: Dictionary of the Ben Cao Gang Mu, Volume 3, Persons and Literary Sources. Band 3. 2018, p. 297
