= Wanyan Zonggan =

Imperial prince of Jin Dynasty

Wanyan Zonggan (Chinese: 完顏宗幹; died 1141), Jurchen name Woben (Chinese: 斡本), the Prince of Liao (遼王), was an imperial prince of the Jurchen–led Chinese Jin dynasty. There is no record of his birth year. Wanyan Zonggan was a Grand Preceptor of the Jin dynasty.

== Family ==
Wives

- Empress Cixian, of the Da clan (慈憲皇后 大氏; d. 1153) from Bohai
  - Digunai (24 February 1122 – 15 December 1161), sinicised name Wanyan Liang, Prince of Hailing (海陵王), became Emperor of the Jin dynasty, second son
  - Another son or daughter
- Lady Li, of the Li clan (李氏)
