= Jin dynasty (1115–1234) =

Jurchen-led imperial dynasty of China

Great Jin 大金
- 1115–1234
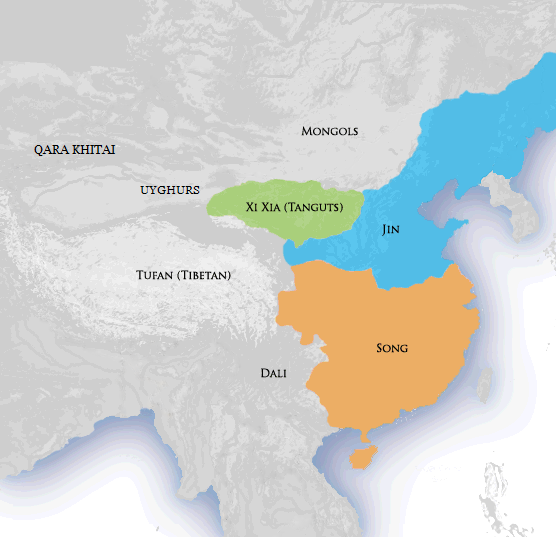
- Jin territory c. 1141 in blue (●)
- Capital: Huiningfu (1122–1153); Zhongdu (1153–1214); Kaifeng (1214–1233); Caizhou (1233–1234)
- Common languages: Middle Chinese (later Old Mandarin), Jurchen, Khitan
- Religion: Buddhism; Taoism; Confucianism; Chinese folk religion
- Government: Monarchy
- Emperor
  - 1115–1123: Taizu (first)
  - 1161–1189: Shizong
  - 1234: Modi (last)
- Historical era: Medieval Asia
  - Founded by Aguda: 28 January 1115
  - Destruction of the Liao dynasty: 26 March 1125
  - Capture of Bianliang from the Northern Song: 9 January 1127
  - Mongol invasion: 1211
  - Fall of Caizhou to the Mongol Empire: 9 February 1234

Area
- 1142 est.: 3,610,000 km^{2} (1,390,000 sq mi)
- 1186 est.: 4,750,000 km^{2} (1,830,000 sq mi)

Population
  - 1186 est.: 53,000,000
- Currency: Jin dynasty coinage: Chinese coin; Chinese cash; paper money
Preceded by
| Liao dynasty |
| Northern Song |
| Northern Liao |
Succeeded by
| Mongol Empire |
| Southern Song |
| Qara Khitai |
| Eastern Xia |
| Eastern Liao |
- Today part of: China; North Korea; Russia

The Jin dynasty (/dʒɪn/, Chinese: 金朝; pinyin: Jīn cháo), (Note: Also Jin Empire (金國; Jīn guó; Jurchen: Anchun Gurun or Alchun Gurun)) officially the Great Jin (大金; Dà Jīn), was a Jurchen-led imperial dynasty of China and empire ruled by the Wanyan clan that existed between 1115 and 1234. (Note: In English, its name is sometimes written as "Kin", "Jinn", or "Chin" in order to differentiate it from the earlier Jin dynasty (266–420), whose name is written identically in pinyin without tone marks.) It is also often called the Jurchen dynasty or the Jurchen Jin after the ruling Jurchen people. At its peak, the empire extended from Outer Manchuria in the north to the Qinling–Huaihe Line in the south.

The Jin dynasty emerged from Wanyan Aguda's rebellion against the Liao dynasty (916–1125), which held sway over northern China until being driven by the nascent Jin to the Western Regions, where they would become known in Chinese historiography as the Western Liao. After conquering the Liao territory, the Jin launched a century-long campaign against the Song dynasty (960–1279) based in southern China, whose rulers were ethnically Han Chinese. Over the course of the Jin's rule, their emperors adapted to Han customs and even fortified the Great Wall against the ascendant Mongol Empire. The Jin also oversaw a number of internal cultural advances, such as the revival of Confucianism.

In 1211, the Mongols, led by Genghis Khan, invaded the Jin Empire, winning several victories. Over the span of 23 years, the Jin faced several defeats, internal revolts, defections, and coups. They were finally conquered by the Mongols in 1234.

== Name ==
The Jin dynasty was officially known as the "Great Jin" (大金), with Jin meaning "gold". The Jurchen word for "gold" was alchun, which Aguda adopted as the name of his state. Alchun may refer to the "Anchuhu" River, which meant "golden" in Jurchen. This river, known as Alechuka in modern Chinese, is a tributary of the Songhua River east of Harbin. Alechuka (阿勒楚喀) is a transliteration of its Manchu name alchuqa (ᠠᠯᠴᡠᡴᠠ), suggesting that the Jurchen name for the river sounded more similar to alchuhu rather than anchuhu. It was common for Chinese translators at the time to use the final -n sound at the end of a Chinese character to transliterate -l, -r, -s, -z etc. at the end of a syllable in foreign words.

After conquering Kaifeng and occupying northern China, one of the suggestions on which of the wuxing ('five elements') to choose for their state was "metal" due to its association with "gold", their state name. This suggestion came as a nativist current that distanced the Jin from the Song and interpreted the Jin as an indigenous development rooted in Northeast Asia unrelated to the precedents of previous Chinese dynasties. However, the emperor dismissed the suggestion of adopting "metal" as their wuxing element. Instead the Jin deliberately chose earth as its dynastic element and yellow as its royal colour. According to the wuxing theory, the earth element follows the fire, the dynastic element of the Song, in the sequence of elemental creation. This ideological move shows that the Jin regarded the Song reign of China as officially over and saw themselves as the rightful ruler of China Proper.

The Mongols called the ruler of the Jin dynasty the "Golden khan" (Altan khan). Through the Mongols, the Jin dynasty became the first Chinese dynasty to be known in Europe by their dynastic name. Marco Polo rendered the Mongol name for the Jin ruler as roi d'or, or "gold king".

The Jin emperors also referred to their state as China, Zhongguo (中國) (“Middle Kingdom”), just as some other non-Han dynasties. Non-Han rulers expanded the definition of "China" to include non-Han peoples in addition to Han people whenever they ruled China. Jin documents indicate that the usage of "China" by dynasties to refer to themselves began earlier than previously thought.

Jin dynasty

Chinese name
- Chinese: 金朝
Transcriptions
Standard Mandarin
- Hanyu Pinyin: Jīncháo
- Bopomofo: ㄐㄧㄣ ㄔㄠˊ
- Wade–Giles: Chin^{1} Ch'ao^{2}
- Tongyong Pinyin: Jincháo
- IPA: [tɕín.ʈʂʰǎʊ]
Yue: Cantonese
- Jyutping: Gam1 ciu4
- IPA: [kɐm˥ tsʰiw˩]

Alternative Chinese name
- Chinese: 大金
- Literal meaning: Great Jin
Transcriptions
Standard Mandarin
- Hanyu Pinyin: Dà Jīn
- Bopomofo: ㄉㄚˋ ㄐㄧㄣ
- Wade–Giles: Ta^{4} Chin^{1}
- Tongyong Pinyin: Dà Jin
- IPA: [tâ.tɕín]
Yue: Cantonese
- Jyutping: Daai6 gam1
- IPA: [taj˨ kɐm˥]

Khitan name
- Khitan: Nik, Niku

The Wanyan surname for the Jurchen imperial family is found in numerous languages in different forms such as Wongian, Wonyan, Wongyan, or Ongging. In the Manchu language, it is rendered Wanggiyan. The name does not originate from Jurchen but from a Sino-Khitan word combining the Middle Chinese title for king or prince (ong; wang in modern Mandarin Chinese) and a Khitan suffix. The name was written as 完顏 during the Liao-Jin period, resulting in the modern Mandarin pronunciation as Wányán. The Wanyan Jurchens therefore means the "kingly" or "royal" Jurchens.

== Origin ==
=== Mohe people ===
The Tungusic speaking Mohe people who lived in what is now Northeast China are the most commonly cited progenitors of the Jin dynasty and its ruling Jurchen ethnic group. They were mentioned in Chinese texts by the late 5th century AD. The Mohe were a primarily sedentary people who practiced hunting, pig farming, and grew crops such as soybean, wheat, millet, and rice. Horses were rare in the region until the Tang period and pastoralism was not widespread until the 10th century under the domination of the Khitans. The Mohe exported reindeer products and may have ridden them as well. They practiced mass slavery and used the slaves to aid in hunting and agricultural work. The Tang described the Mohe as a fierce and uncultured people who used poisoned arrows.

The two most powerful groups of Mohe were the Heishui Mohe (Blackwater Mohe) in the north, named after the Heilong River (Black River), and the Sumo Mohe in the south, named after the Songhua River. According to the ancestral traditions of early 12th century Jurchens, their people emerged from the Heishui Mohe in the forested mountain areas of eastern Manchuria and Russia's Primorsky Krai. In the 10th century, the Mohe formed a group known as the Wuguo (五國) ("Five Nations") federation to the northeast of modern Jilin that is also considered to have contributed to rise of the Jurchens. The Jurchens may have been mentioned as the Little Ruzhe people who presented silver and gold to the Tang court in 748, otherwise the Jurchens do not appear in historical records until the 10th century as tribute bearers to the Liao, Later Tang, and Song courts. A Jurchen embassy to Later Tang is recorded in 925 and an embassy to the Song in 961 that arrived by sea via the Liaodong peninsula. They practiced hunting, fishing, and kept domestic oxen while their primary export was horses. They had no script, calendar, or offices during the mid-11th century. The Jurchens were minor political actors in the international system at the time. By the 10th century, the Jurchens had become vassals of the Liao dynasty, but they also sent a number of tributary and trade missions to the Song capital of Kaifeng, which the Liao tried unsuccessfully to prevent. Some Jurchens paid tribute to Goryeo and sided with them during the Goryeo–Khitan War. They offered tribute to both courts out of political necessity and for material benefits.

In the 11th century, there was widespread discontent against Khitan rule among the Jurchens as the Liao violently extorted annual tribute from the Jurchen tribes. Leveraging the Jurchens' desire for independence from the Khitans, chief Wugunai (1021–1074) of the Wanyan clan rose to prominence, dominating all of eastern Manchuria from Mount Changbai to the Wuguo tribes. According to tradition, Wugunai was a sixth generation descendant of Hanpu while his father held a military title from the Liao court, although the title did not confer or hold any real power. His grandson Aguda eventually founded the Jin dynasty.

=== Balhae ===
==== Ethnicity ====
The Mohe (Kr. Malgal) people made up part of the population of the Northeast Asian state of Balhae (698–926), also rendered as Bohai. The exact significance and role of the Mohe people in Balhae's social structure is disputed as part of the Balhae controversies. Due to the scarcity of indigenous Balhae sources, the study of Balhae draws on a wide range of textual sources from outside of Balhae, and investigations into Balhae's ethnic makeup usually start from the two official histories of the Tang dynasty. The Old Book of Tang states that Dae Joyeong (C. Da Zuorong), the founder of Balhae, was ethnically Mohe but adds that he was "'gaoli biezhong" (高麗別種). Literally speaking, biezhong means "separate kind." Due to the ambiguity of the wording, the term has been interpreted as meaning "a branch of the Goguryeo people" by South and North Korean historians, but as "distinct from Goguryeo" by Chinese researchers. The New Book of Tang refers to Dae Joyeong and his state as Sumo Mohe affiliated with Goguryeo before it received investiture from China and assumed the name "Bohai". According to historian Jesse D. Sloane, Tang sources divided Balhae's population into two categories, Goguryeo and Mohe. The royalty and upper class were composed of Goguryeo remnants while the majority of Balhae's population were Mohe.

Other historical sources also present different views on Balhae's relationship to Goguryeo and the Mohe. According to Ch'oe Ch'iwŏn (b. 857), a scholar from the Korean kingdom of Silla, the people of Balhae were Mohe. Sillan aristocracy tended to view the Balhae population as consisting of solely Mohe people, but this could be due to the antagonistic relations between the two states causing the Sillan nobility to ignore Goguryeo elements of Balhae ethnic composition. The Samguk sagi, written in the 12th century by Kim Pusik, did not consider Balhae a Korean state. The Samguk yusa, a 13th-century collection of Korean history and legends, describes Dae as a Sumo Mohe leader. However, it gives another account of Dae being a former Goguryeo general, citing a now-lost Sillan record. While diplomatic communications between Balhae and Japan recognized it as a successor state of Goguryeo and Buyeo, a 9th-century Japanese text also states that all of Balhae's villages were Mohe tribes.

==== Relationship to the Jurchens ====
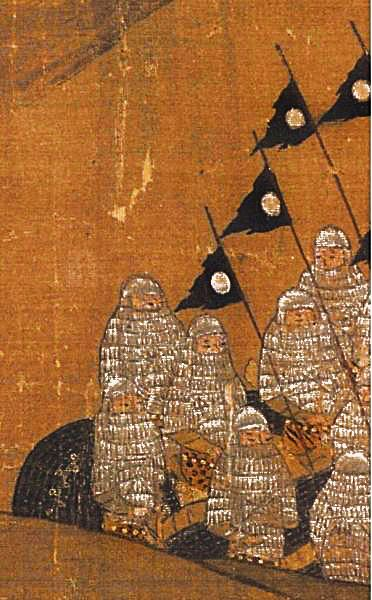
Jin "iron pagoda" cavalry

In the early 12th century, the Jurchen leader Aguda sent ambassadors to the Liao dynasty to call on the Balhae people there to rebel against the Liao by appealing to a common origin between the Jurchens and Balhae. Aguda claimed that "the Jurchens and Bohai were originally of the same family" (女直渤海本同一家) and that they were "actually one family, because in origin they were consisted of seven Wuji tribes." The appeal states that both the Jurchens and Balhae people descended from the seven Wuji (Kr. Mulgil) tribes. However, according to Alexander Kim, this only applied to the Mohe portion of Balhae's population and not the Goguryeo people, who were not included in the seven Wuji tribes. The call for Balhae cooperation against the Liao Khitans was a success. A Song observer notes that due to discrimination in the Liao government against Balhae people, they were the first to defect to the Jin.

Families of Balhae descent were able to rise high in the Jin hierarchy. Aguda was advised by a Balhae man named Yang Pu who aided him in establishing an imperial court. Another Balhae man named Gao Qinyi became the advisor of Wanyan Zonghan, a Jurchen general and close friend of Aguda. An 1125 embassy noted that Jin protocol officers included Khitans, Jurchens, as well as Balhae who all spoke Chinese. Balhae descendants were integrated into the Jin military and government structure, serving as military commanders in the wars against the Song dynasty and the Mongols, as well as advisors for the Jin emperors. Some Jin emperors were descended from Balhae people through their mothers. Many Balhae-literati officials were trusted as arbiters of culture. Despite significant integration into the Jin state, the Balhae people continued to exist apart from the Jurchens, but their identity gradually eroded under Jin rule, possibly due to increased interaction with Jurchen as large numbers of Jurchen soldiers and their families moved south.

Many Balhae people who were deeply integrated into the Jin state eventually rejected their Balhae identity and chose to identify as Chinese. By the time of Balhae's demise, its people's way of living had come to resemble that of the northern Chinese. The Liao dynasty classified the Balhae population as Han in legal and taxation contexts, the same as those whose ancestry was traced to the Tang empire. Some Mohe groups did not adopt this manner of life and were excluded from the Liao's designation of Balhae. Instead, they remained as Mohe, and possibly became one of the groups that eventually coalesced into the Jurchen people.

The later Qing dynasty, ruled by Manchu descendants of the Jurchens, made efforts to solidify Balhae as part of their ancestral background. In 1778, the Qianlong Emperor reviewed commissioned a new comprehensive history of the Manchus, the Researches on Manchu Origins. Part of this endeavor was to create a new imperial history of Manchus that placed their Jin ancestors, the Jin imperial clan, among the population of the Mohe, who lived in the Changbai Mountains and along the Amur. Qianlong repeatedly made references to the Balhae as the origin of various organizational features such as the use of "the five-capitals, a writing system, and a leadership hierarchy that he believed was evident in early Qing history and still in use among Northeastern peoples."

Archaeological materials from the Anan'evskoe site also support the existence of ancestral relations between the Jurchens and Balhae people. Several South Korean scholars suggest that after Balhae's destruction in 926, its population was divided into two groups. Influential Balhae families were sent to the inner part of the Liao dynasty and were referred to as Balhae people while those who remained under indirect management were called Jurchen. Soviet and Russian scholars agree that there were hereditary relationships between the Mohe and Jurchen and that the Balhae population certainly contributed culturally to the ethnogenesis of the Jurchen. However, some differences remain between the two populations. The Balhae refugee population was received well in the Korean kingdom of Goryeo while they had a combative relationship with the Jurchens. In diplomatic communications with the Song dynasty, Goryeo referred to the Jurchens as greedy liars and other insulting names. The Jurchens likewise described Goryeo people as enemies and often came into military conflict with them. The Jurchen and Balhae people also differed in their level of technological and societal sophistication. Chinese sources describe the Jurchens as lacking law, governors, kings, or dignitaries. Prior to the reign of Wanyan Wugunai (1021–1074) in the early 11th century, the Jurchens could not produce iron armor and had to trade for it from other tribes.

=== Wanyan clan ===
==== Wanyan origin ====
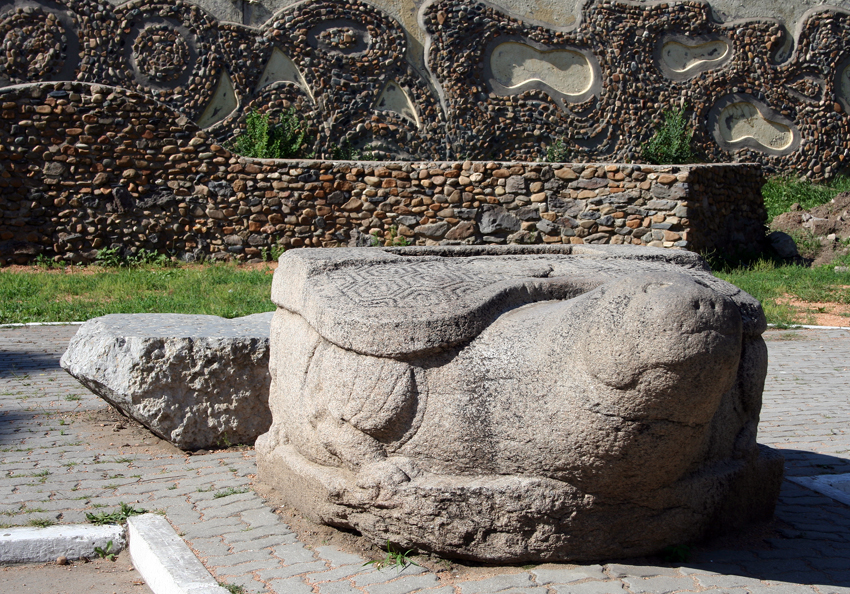
Stone tortoise in Ussurisk, believed to be the gravesite of a 12th century Jurchen leader

There is no dated evidence of the Jurchens before the time of Wugunai (1021–74), when the Jurchens began to coalesce into a nation-like federation. According to tradition passed down via oral transmission, Wugunai was the 6th generation descendant of Hanpu, the founder of the Wanyan clan, who therefore must have lived around the year 900. Hanpu originally came from the Heishui Mohe tribe of Balhae. According to the History of Jin, when he came to the Wanyan tribe, it was a form of compensation for the repayment of a murder. He had two brothers, one who stayed in Goryeo and the other in Balhae when he left. By the time he arrived and settled among the Wanyan, he was already 60 years old and accepted as a "wise man". He succeeded in settling a dispute between two families without resorting to violence, and as a reward, was betrothed to a worthy unmarried maiden also 60 years old. The marriage was blessed with the gift of a dark ox, which was revered in Jurchen culture, and from this union came one daughter and three sons. With this, Hanpu became the chief of the Wanyan and his descendants became formal members of the Wanyan clan.

Because Hanpu arrived from Goryeo, some South Korean scholars have claimed that Hanpu hailed from Goryeo. According to Alexander Kim, this cannot be easily identified as him being Korean because many Balhae people lived in Goryeo at that time. Later when Aguda appealed to the Balhae people in the Liao dynasty for support by emphasizing their common origin, he only mentioned those who descended from the "seven Wuji tribes", which the Goguryeo people were not a part of. It seems by that point, the Jurchens saw only the Mohe tribes as a related people. Some western scholars consider the origin of Hanpu to be legendary in nature. Herbert Franke described the narrative provided in the History of Jin as an "ancestral legend" with a historical basis in that the Wanyan clan had absorbed immigrants from Goryeo and Balhae during the 10th century. Frederick W. Mote described it as a "tribal legend" that may have born the tribe's memories. The two brothers remaining in Goryeo and Balhae may represent ancestral ties to those two peoples while Hanpu's marriage may represent the tribe's transformation from a matrilineal to patrilineal society.

Wugunai was a sixth generation descendant of Hanpu. He and his father had received military titles from the Liao court but they held no real power or functions other than recognition of the Liao's loose sovereignty. According to Jin sources, the Jurchens had no writing, calendar, or offices in the 11th century. In those times, a significant number of place names were simply named the "town of such and such a person". Wugunai is described as "a brave warrior, a great eater and drinker, and a lover of women". He extended his rule from the Changbai Mountains in the south to the Wuguo "Five Nations" in the north. The Liao appointed him as the military governor of the Uncivilized Jurchens.

==== Goryeo-Jurchen war ====
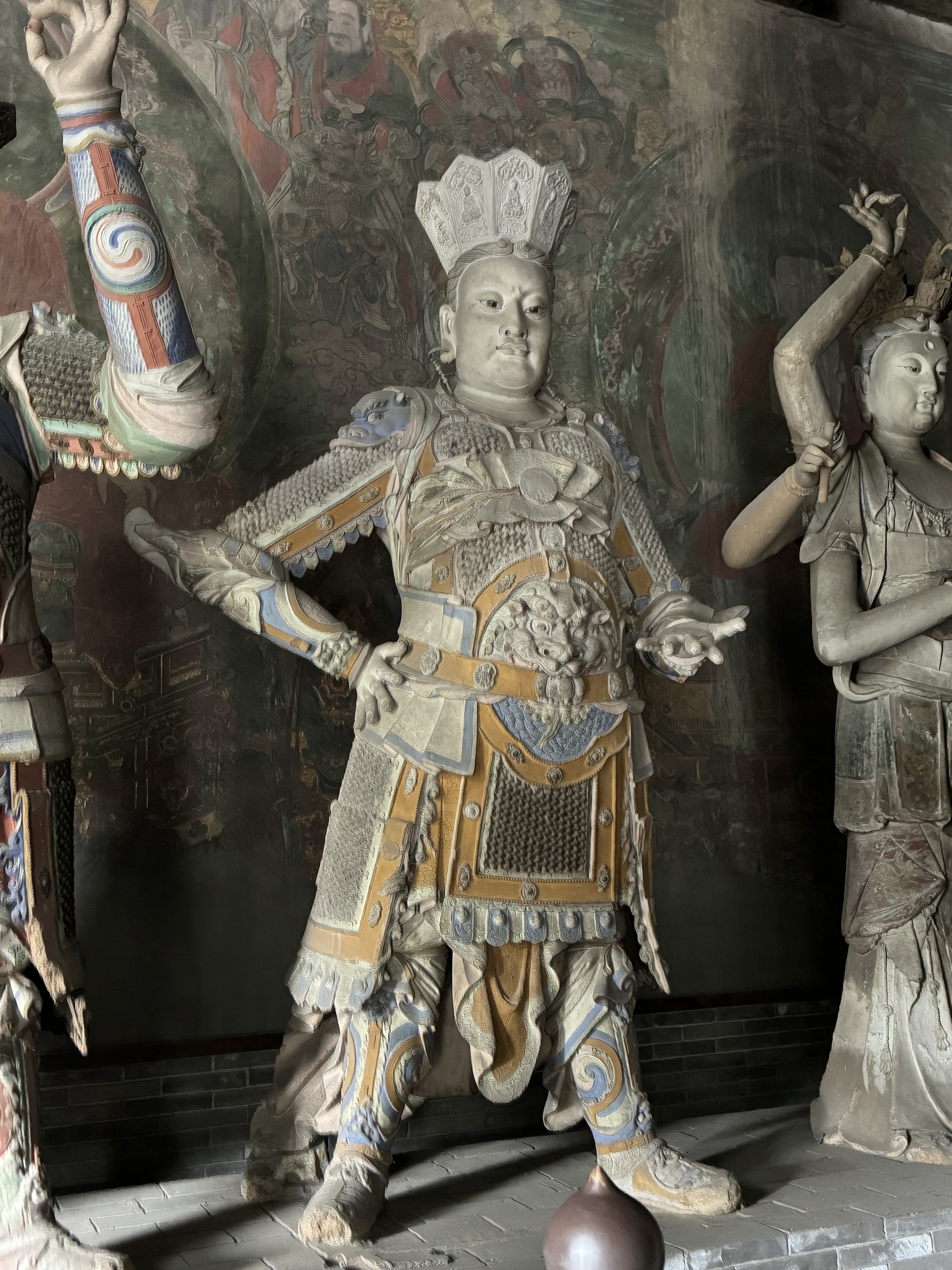
Statue of Vaisravana, Jin dynasty

The Jurchens in the Yalu River region had been tributaries of Goryeo since the reign of Taejo of Goryeo (r. 918-943), who called upon them during the wars of the Later Three Kingdoms period. Taejo relied heavily on a large Jurchen cavalry force to defeat Later Baekje. The Jurchens switched allegiances between Liao and Goryeo multiple times depending on which they deemed the most appropriate. The Liao and Goryeo competed to gain the allegiance of Jurchen settlers who effectively controlled much of the border area beyond Goryeo and Liao fortifications. These Jurchens offered tribute but expected to be rewarded richly by Goryeo in return. However the Jurchens who offered tribute were often the same ones who raided Goryeo's borders. In one instance, the Goryeo court discovered that a Jurchen leader who had brought tribute had been behind the recent raids on their territory. The frontier was largely outside of direct control and lavish gifts were doled out as a means of controlling the Jurchens. Goryeo inhabitants were forbidden from trading with Jurchens. Sometimes Jurchens submitted to Goryeo and were given citizenship.

The tributary relations between Jurchens and Goryeo began to change under the reign of Jurchen leader Wuyashu (r. 1103–1113) of the Wanyan clan. The Wanyan clan was intimately aware of the Jurchens who had submitted to Goryeo and used their power to break the clans' allegiance to Goryeo, unifying the Jurchens. The resulting conflict between the two powers led to Goryeo's withdrawal from Jurchen territory and acknowledgment of Jurchen control over the contested region.

As the geopolitical situation shifted, Goryeo unleashed a series of military campaigns in the early 12th century to regain control of its borderlands. Goryeo had already been in conflict with the Jurchens before. In 984, Goryeo failed to control the Yalu River basin due to conflict with the Jurchens. In 1056, Goryeo repelled the Eastern Jurchens and afterward destroyed their stronghold of over 20 villages. In 1080, Munjong of Goryeo led a force of 30,000 to conquer ten villages. However by the rise of the Wanyan clan, the quality of Goryeo's army had degraded and it mostly consisted of infantry. There were several clashes with the Jurchens, usually resulting in Jurchen victory with their mounted cavalrymen. In 1104, the Wanyan Jurchens reached Chongju while pursuing tribes resisting them. Goryeo sent Lim Gan to confront the Jurchens, but his untrained army was defeated, and the Jurchens took Chongju castle. Lim Gan was dismissed from office and reinstated, dying as a civil servant in 1112. The war effort was taken up by Yun Kwan, but the situation was unfavorable and he returned after making peace.

Yun Kwan believed that the loss was due to their inferior cavalry and proposed to the king that an elite force known as the Byeolmuban (別武班; "Special Warfare Army") be created. it existed apart from the main army and was made up of cavalry, infantry, and a Hangmagun ("Subdue Demon Corps"). In December 1107, Yun Kwan and O Yŏnch’on set out with 170,000 soldiers to conquer the Jurchens. The army won against the Jurchens and built Nine Fortresses over a wide area on the frontier encompassing Jurchen tribal lands, and erected a monument to mark the boundary. However due to unceasing Jurchen attacks, diplomatic appeals, and court intrigue, the Nine Fortresses were handed back to the Jurchens. In 1108, Yun Kwan was removed from office and the Nine Fortresses were turned over to the Wanyan clan. It is plausible that the Jurchens and Goryeo had some sort of implicit understanding where the Jurchens would cease their attacks while Goryeo took advantage of the conflict between the Jurchens and Khitans to gain territory. According to Breuker, Goryeo never really had control of the region occupied by the Nine Fortresses in the first place and maintaining hegemony would have meant a prolonged conflict with militarily superior Jurchen troops that would prove very costly. The Nine Fortresses were exchanged for Poju (Uiju), a region the Jurchens later contested when Goryeo hesitated to recognise them as their suzerain.

Later, when Wuyashu's younger brother Aguda founded the Jin dynasty (1115–1234), the Jurchens called Goryeo their "parent country" or "father and mother" country. This was because it had traditionally been part of their system of tributary relations, its rhetoric, advanced culture, as well as the idea that it was "bastard offspring of Koryŏ". The Jin pressured Goryeo to become their subject. While many in Goryeo were against this, Yi Cha-gyöm was in power at the time and judged peaceful relations with the Jin to be beneficial to his own political power. He accepted the Jin demands and in 1126, the king of Goryeo declared himself a Jin vassal (tributary). However the Goryeo king retained his position as "Son of Heaven" within Goryeo. By incorporating Jurchen history into that of Goryeo and emphasizing the Jin emperors as bastard offspring of Goryeo, and placing the Jin within the template of a "northern dynasty", the imposition of Jin suzerainty became more acceptable.

==== Conflict with the Khitan Liao ====
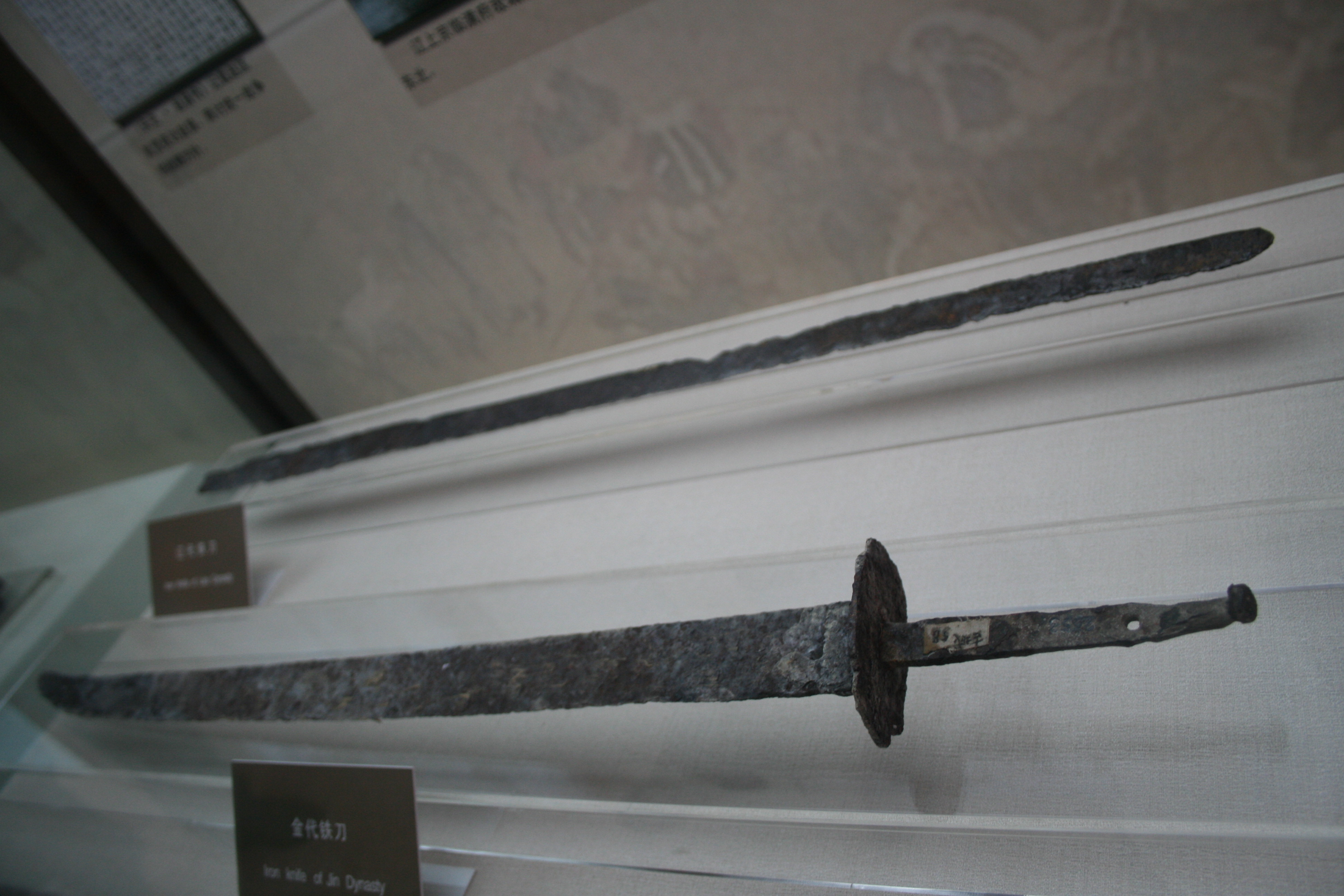
Liao or Jin dynasty swords

The Jurchens had been in conflict with the Khitans since the rise of the Liao dynasty (916–1125). As early as the 9th century, the Khitans had attacked the Jurchens during their rise to power. In the early 10th century, the founder of the Liao dynasty, Abaoji, attacked the Jurchens as well as several other neighboring peoples like the Shiwei, Kumo Xi, and the Tang dynasty. With the annexation of Balhae by the Liao in 926, the Jurchens became direct subjects of the Liao. In 973 and 976, the Jurchens looted Liao territory. In 991, the Khitans tried to prevent their Jurchen tributaries from trading with the Song by building palisades cutting off a land route that the Jurchens had to pass through. However, Jurchen-Song relations continued via a sea route until the early 11th century. In 1029, a group of Jurchens joined Da Yanlin, a descendant of Balhae royalty, in rebelling against the Liao dynasty. Da Yanlin's rebel Xingliao state was defeated the next year.

The Liao categorized the Jurchens into three groups: "civilized" Jurchens (shu nüzhi) descended from tribes captured by the Liao in the 10th century and assimilated into Khitan society, "obedient" Jurchens (shun nüzhi) subordinate to the Liao and had regular contact with the court, and "wild" Jurchens (sheng nüzhi) who inhabited the lower Songhua River valley and the eastern mountains of modern Heilongjiang. The wild Jurchens were nominally subordinate to the Liao but were functionally independent. During the 11th century, the Wanyan clan established dominance over their neighbours and created a semblance of Jurchen unity. The Liao court recognized this and conferred on their chieftains the title of military governor.

As the Wanyan clan consolidated their control over the Jurchens, relations with the Liao became increasingly strained. The Jurchens resented the behaviour of Liao officials at Ningjiang, the main border trading post, who constantly cheated them. The Liao also placed on them the obligation of supplying the Liao emperor with gyrfalcons called haidongqing, only bred on the coastal regions, which required the Jurchens to fight across the territory of their neighbours, the Five Nations, to access. Liao envoys also habitually beat their village elders and abused their women. One of the primary causes of the Jurchen rebellion was the custom of raping married Jurchen women and Jurchen girls by Khitan envoys, which caused resentment from the Jurchens. The custom of having sex with unmarried girls was not a problem by Khitans, since the practice of guest prostitution – giving female companions, food and shelter to guests – was common among Jurchens. Unmarried daughters of Jurchen families of lower and middle classes in Jurchen villages were provided to Khitan messengers for sex, as recorded by Hong Hao. There is no evidence that guest prostitution of unmarried Jurchen girls to Khitan men was resented by the Jurchens. It was only when the Khitans forced aristocratic Jurchen families to give up their beautiful wives as guest prostitutes to Khitan messengers that the Jurchens became resentful.

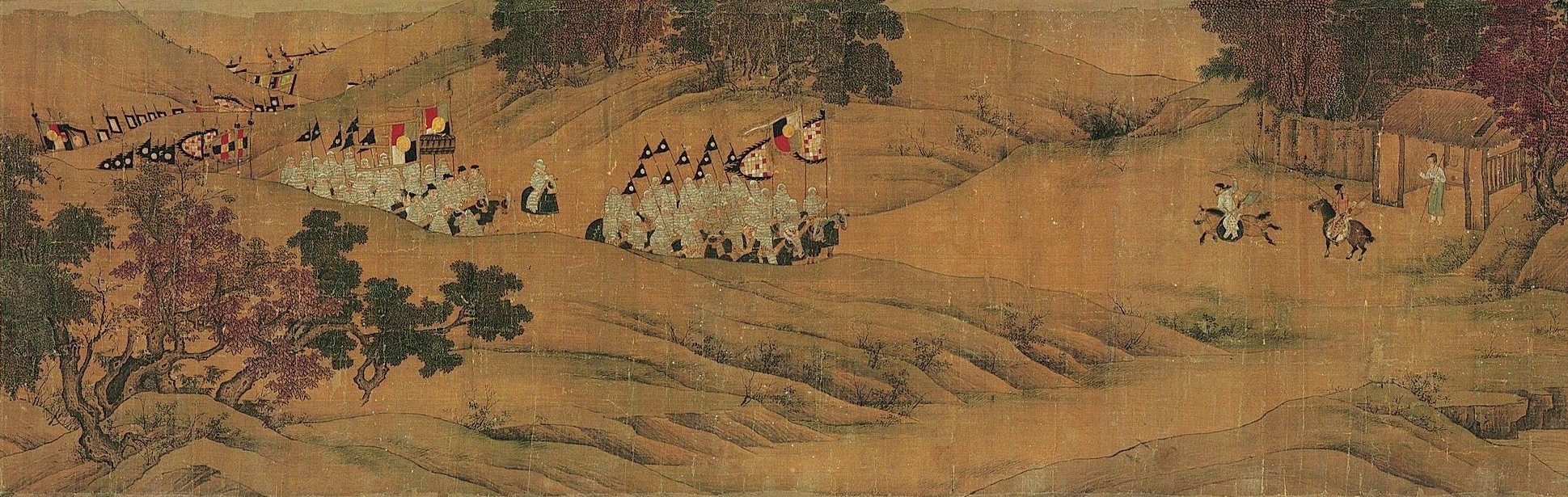
Jurchen "iron pagoda" cavalry from the scroll painting Ruiyingtu, Song dynasty

== History ==
=== Taizu (1115–1123) ===
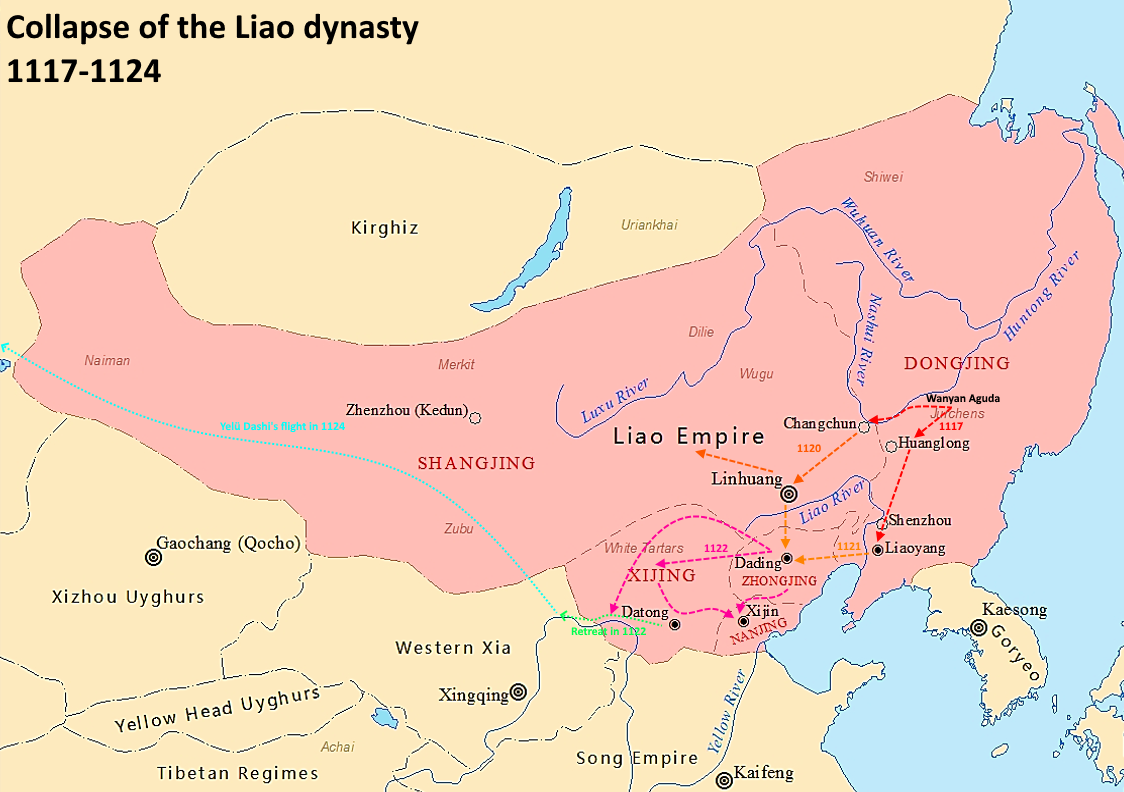
Collapse of the Liao dynasty (1117–1124)

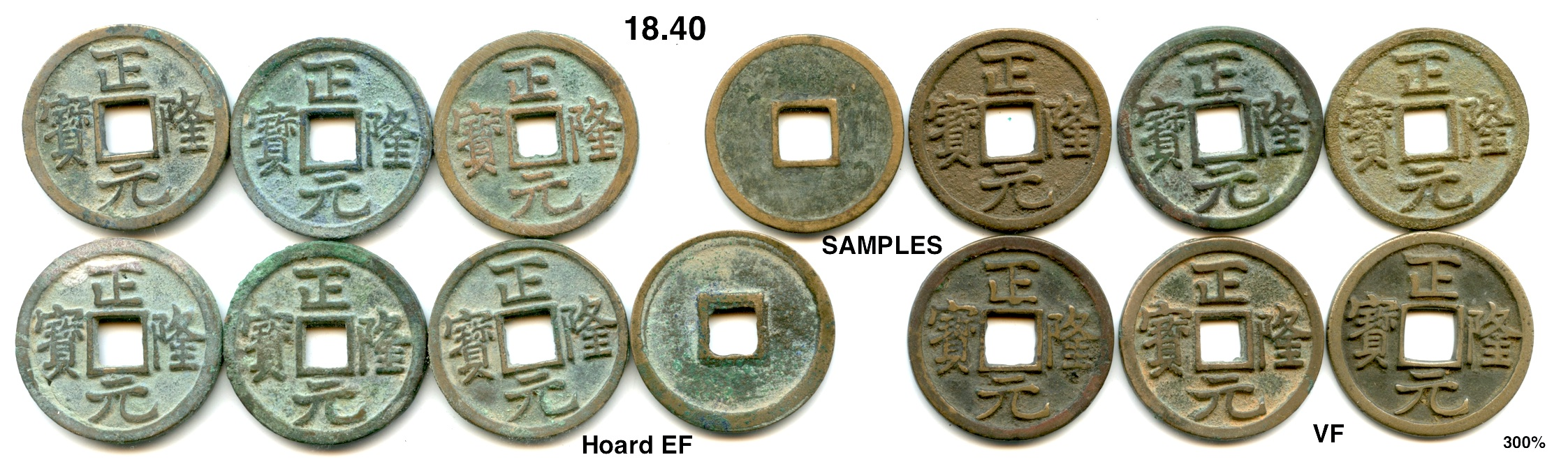
Jin dynasty coins, 1158-1161

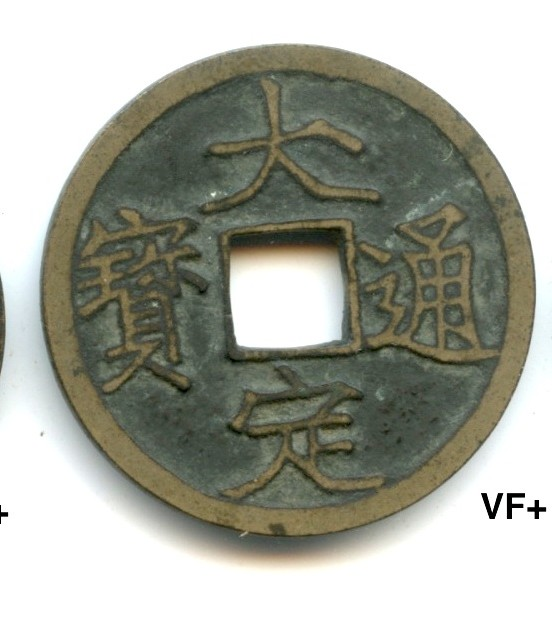
Jin dynasty coin, 1178

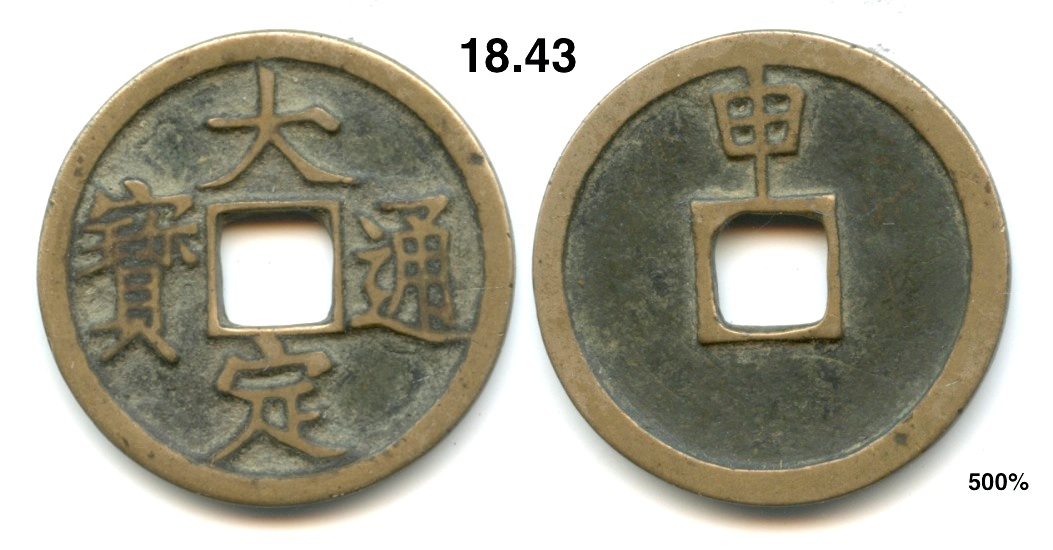
Jin dynasty coins, 1188

After Wuyashu's death in 1113, his brother Aguda (posthumously Emperor Taizu of Jin) was elected leader of the Jurchens by the tribal elders. The Liao continued to bestow upon the Wanyan leaders the title of military governor, but the Jurchens soon came into military conflict with the Liao.

In late 1112, Emperor Tianzuo of Liao embarked on a fishing expedition to the Huntong River (modern Songhua River) where the Jurchen tribes were expected to pay homage to the emperor. As a symbolic gesture of obeisance, the Jurchen chieftains were supposed to get up in turn and dance in the emperor's camp, but one of them, Aguda, refused. Even after being bidden three times, Aguda still refused to dance. Tianzuo wanted him executed for his act of defiance but the influential chancellor, Xiao Fengxian, dissuaded him from that course and belittled the harm Aguda could do. This would prove to be a fatal mistake as Aguda was elected ruler of the Jurchens in the following year. Aguda immediately began harassing the Liao for the return of Ashu, a Jurchen chieftain who opposed Wanyan hegemony and had taken refuge in Liao territory, and when his demands were refused, began building fortifications on the Liao border. In the late autumn of 1114 Aguda attacked Ningjiang. Underestimating the Jurchen threat, Tianzuo only sent some Balhae detachments from the Eastern Capital, which were defeated. Another force composed of Khitan and Kumo Xi troops led by Xiao Sixian, the brother of Xiao Fengxian, was also defeated on the Songhua. Despite Sixian's incompetence, he escaped punishment, leading to demoralization of Khitan generals. By the end of the year, several border prefectures had been taken by the Jurchens and some neighboring tribes had also joined them.

In 1115 Tianzuo sent envoys to negotiate with the Jurchens, but Aguda had already declared himself emperor of the Jin "Gold" dynasty in the spring of 1115, and rejected the Liao letters because they did not address him by his new title. Aguda also took on a Chinese name (Min "compassionate") and a Chinese reign title (Shouguo "receiving statehood") in addition to all the regalia befitting of a Chinese emperor. The one responsible for this seems to be a man of Balhae origins, Yang Pu, who had received the jinshi degree under the Liao as a young man. He advised Aguda not to be content with mere independence for the Jurchens but to aspire to emperorship based on Chinese traditions.

Aguda continued to demand the return of Ashu and the withdraw of Liao troops from Huanglong, the major administrative centre of the region. Huanglong fell to the Jin in late autumn. Tianzuo assembled a massive army west of the Songhua and crossed the river in the winter of 1115. His invasion was undermined by a plot to dethrone him and install his uncle, Prince Chun. The conspirators led by Yelü Zhangnu deserted the army and sent messengers informing Chun of their plan. Chun refused to take part in the coup and beheaded Zhangnu's messengers. The rebels then went about the countryside creating havoc until they were defeated by a small group of loyal Jurchens. Zhangnu was caught trying to escape to the Jin disguised as a messenger and was executed by being cut in half at the waist. More than 200 implicated nobles were executed and their families condemned to slavery. In early 1116 another rebellion occurred at the Eastern Capital when a Balhae officer named Gao Yongchang declared himself emperor of the Yuan dynasty and requested aid from the Jin. The Jin relief troops to Yuan easily repulsed the Liao troops but then turned on the Balhae rebels and killed Gao Yongchang. With the destruction of the Yuan dynasty, the entire region east of the Liao River fell to the Jin. To ensure Chun's continued loyalty, he was made commander in chief of the Liao armies and entrusted with defence operations against the Jin. Chun proved to be an awful commander. His new army, composed of Balhae refugees, inflicted more damage on the civilian population than the enemies. When the Jin attacked Chunzhou on the Songhua in early 1117, the Liao army melted away, not even offering a token resistance. At the end of the year, the Jin forces crossed the Liao River, defeated Chun's army, and conquered several prefectures.

After the Jin's initial conquests, a lull in military activity followed. The Song started negotiating an alliance with the Jin in 1117. At first, an envoy was sent to the Jin court under the pretext of buying horses, but in reality it was the start of negotiations between the two empires. During the period from 1117–1123, the Song sent envoys to the Jin court seven times while the Jin sent six embassies. Despite these diplomatic efforts, by the time a formal treaty was finalized in 1123, Aguda had realized that there was no need for an alliance with the Song who were too militarily weak to render any significant aid to Jin campaigns. The treaty ironed out in 1123 portrayed the Jin and Song as equals. Aguda was addressed as the "August Emperor of the great Jin" on equal terms with the Song emperor. The treaty specified that the Song was to pay the Jin annual payments previously granted to the Liao and in addition they would also pay compensation in return for lost revenue from the prefectures of the Yan region that were to be returned to the Song. The treaty text, however, contains no specific instructions on how the prefectures were to be returned to the Song. Details on border delimitation were also left for future negotiations. The vagueness of the treaty points and the instability of the situation surrounding the Alliance Conducted at Sea would usher in an era of warfare between the Jin and Song rather than one of peaceful co-existence.

In 1118 Tianzuo initiated peace negotiations, but the Jin demands were so onerous, requesting half of the Liao empire in addition to payments of silk and silver, that they were impossible to meet. Aguda was unable to immediately continue military campaigns against the Liao due to stretched resources. In 1119 a rebellion against the Jin occurred at the Eastern Capital and had to be suppressed. This brief interlude was no less kind to the Liao, which was plagued by famine, local rebellions, and defections to the Jin. Hostilities renewed in the spring of 1120 when Aguda broke off negotiations.

The Jin captured the Supreme Capital in mid-1120 and stopped its advance to escape the summer heat. In the spring of 1121, Tianzuo's second wife, Lady Wen, conspired with her brother in law, General Yelü Yudu, to depose the emperor and enthrone her son. The plot was uncovered by Xiao Fengxian, whose sister, Lady Yuan, also hoped to have her son succeed. Lady Wen was forced to commit suicide but Yudu escaped and defected to the Jin. He was allowed to remain in command of his troops and in the winter of 1121–22, he led Jin forces to capture the Central Capital. Leaving Prince Chun in charge of the Southern Capital, Tianzuo embarked on a prolonged flight from the Jin, passing through Juyong Pass to the Western Capital. Shortly afterward, Tianzuo grew tired of Xiao Fengxian's manipulations, which had caused the death of his son, and had him commit suicide. Tianzuo then fled to the Yin Mountains where he tried to recruit fresh troops from local tribes. Following his trail, the Jin took the Western Capital in the spring of 1122. The Tanguts, fearing an invasion of their border, sent troops in support of Tianzuo and blocked the Jurchen advance. Soon after Aguda arrived, he defeated a Khitan-Tangut force near the Xia border, and turned back east to take the Southern Capital, where Prince Chun had been declared the new Liao emperor (Northern Liao).

Only three months after becoming emperor, Chun died, leaving his widowed empress in charge. In the late autumn of 1122, her commanders Guo Yaoshi and Gao Feng defected with their troops to the Song dynasty. They led Song troops in an attack on the Southern Capital, but even in the Liao's withered state, the Song army was still unable to overcome Khitan defenses and failed to take the city. In the winter, Aguda took the Southern Capital, and the remaining Khitans fled in two groups to the west. One group led by Xiao Gan fled to Western Xia where they set up a short lived Xi dynasty that lasted only five months before Gan died at the hands of his own troops. The other group, led by Yelü Dashi, joined Tianzuo at the Xia border. In the early summer of 1123, Dashi was captured by the Jin and forced to lead them to Tianzuo's camp, where the entire imperial family except for Tianzuo and one son were captured.

Aguda did not live to see the final defeat of the Liao. He died a few months after the treaty with the Song was concluded in 1123.

=== Taizong (1123–1135) ===
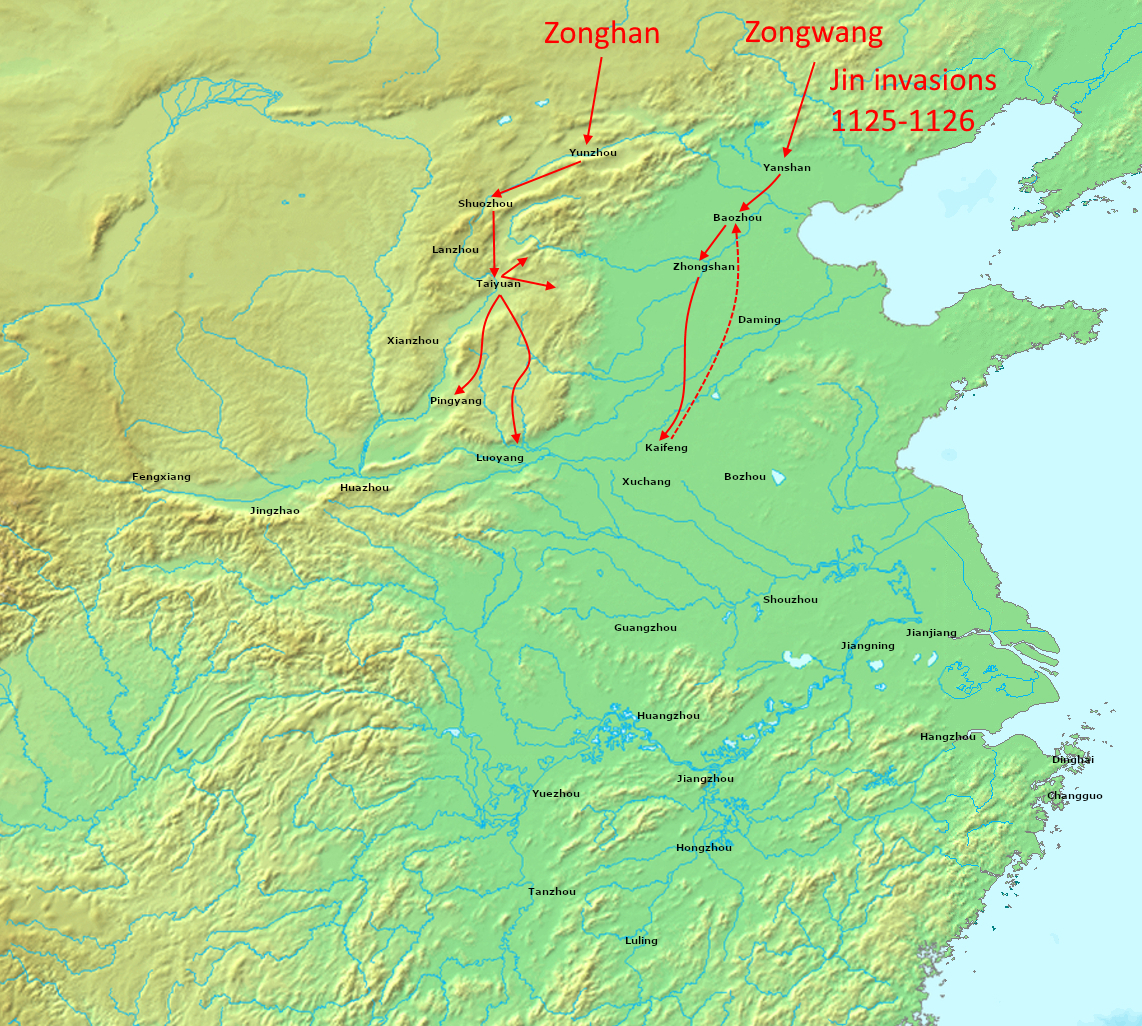
Jin invasions of Song, 1125–1126

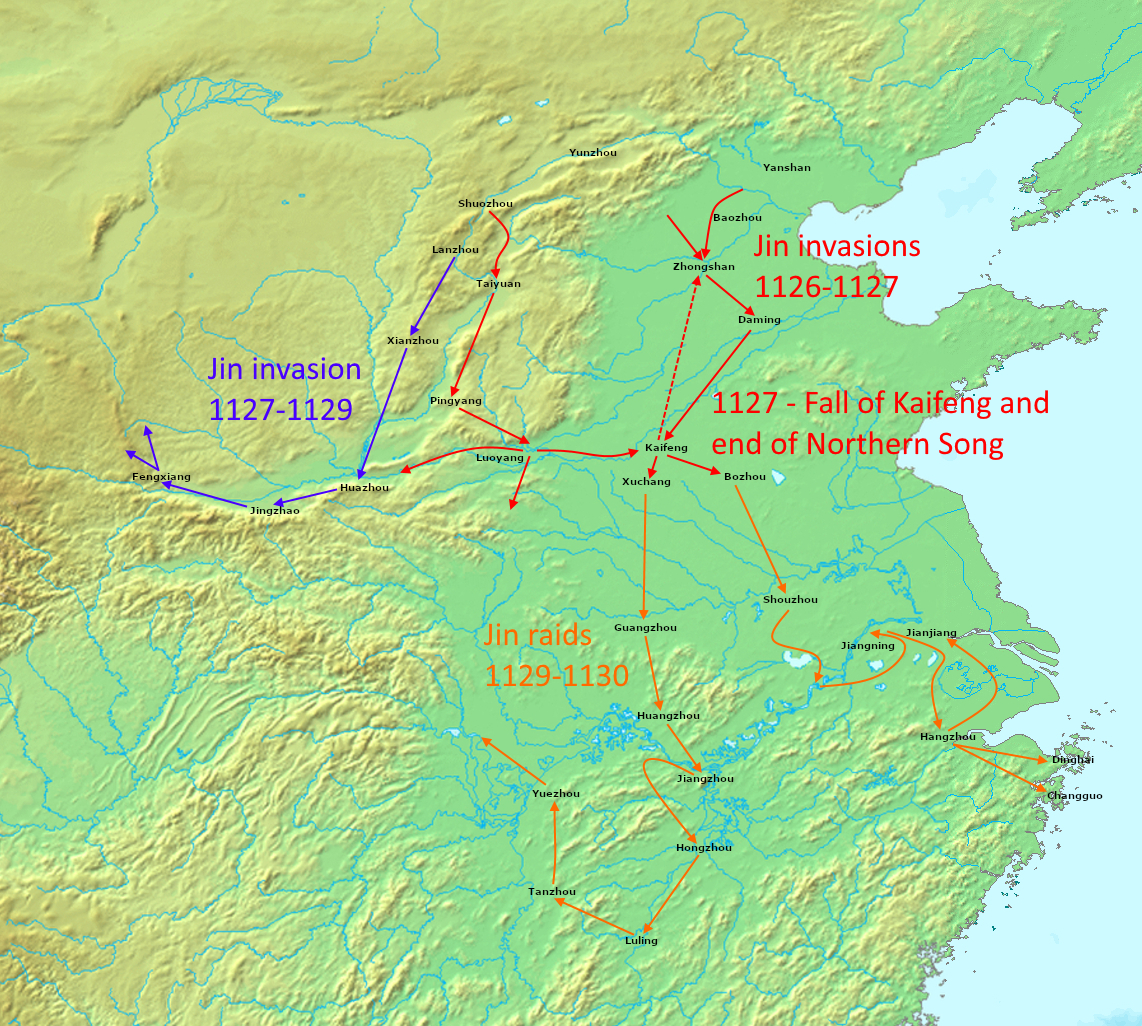
Jin invasions of Song, 1126–1130

After Aguda died in 1123, he was succeeded by his younger brother Wuqimai (posthumously Emperor Taizong of Jin). Wuqimai oversaw the final defeat of the Liao dynasty and continued to expand the Jin dynasty's territory by waging war on the Song.

Emperor Tianzuo of Liao sought refuge with Emperor Chongzong of Western Xia, who while initially receptive, changed his mind after warnings from the Jurchens and declared himself a vassal of Jin in 1124. Tianzuo fled further north into the steppes where he traded his clothes for food from the Khongirad. In spite of all these setbacks, Tianzuo still held onto the delusion of retaking the Western and Southern Capitals, and attacked nearby prefectures. Yelü Dashi, who had rejoined Tianzuo, grew tired of his behaviour and left for the west. Tianzuo was captured in early 1125 and taken to the Jin court where he held the title of "king of the seashore" (haipin wang). According to the History of Liao, Tianzuo died at the age of 54 in 1128.

After the defeat of the Liao dynasty and the submission of the Western Xia as a vassal, Wuqimai strengthened border defenses against Goryeo and quelled unrest among the Balhae districts. The Jin then focused its attention on the Song frontier. Prior to Aguda's death, the former Liao military governor of Pingzhou named Zhang Jue killed a Liao commander of Yan who had defected to the Jin. Zhang Jue declared his allegiance to the Song, who reappointed him to his former office. A Jin army attacked Pingzhou, forcing Zhang Jue to escape to Yan, where another former Liao commander, Guo Yaoshi, had defected to the Song. The Jin pressured the Song into returning Zhang Jue, whom they considered a criminal. The Song acquiesced to their demands, executed Zhang Jue, and sent his head to the Jin. Realizing that the Song were unwilling to stand up to the Jin, Guo Yaoshi declared his allegiance to the Jin, who reinstated him as the governor of Yan.

The Jin decided to invade the Song in the fall of 1125. Within a few months, they had occupied most of Shanxi and Hebei. In early 1126, the Jin army crossed the Yellow River and laid siege to the Song capital of Kaifeng. Due to considerations for material losses that the Jin army would have incurred from a prolonged siege, the Jin commander, Wanyan Zongwang (Wolibu, second son of Aguda), withdrew with heavy concessions from the Song. The Song ceded the three prefectures of Taiyuan, Hejian, and Zhongshan, representing the majority of Shanxi and Hebei's territory. The Song was also forced to pay a large indemnity in silver, silk, and coins worth 180 years of annual payments. The prince of Kang, a younger brother of Emperor Qinzong, was sent to Zongwang's camp along with the high ranking official Zhang Bangchang as hostages. After a week of negotiations, the siege of Kaifeng was lifted on 10 February 1126. A mistake that the Song had made during this invasion was the removal of the defensive forest that was planted along the Song-Liao border. Because of the removal of this landscape barrier, in 1126/27, the Jin army marched quickly across the North China Plain to Bianjing (present-day Kaifeng).

Conflict between the Jin and the Song recommenced almost immediately after the Jin army withdrew. It is uncertain what caused the second campaign but the Jin may have believed that the Song were weak enough to be completely defeated. The Jin accused the Song of inciting former Liao generals to attack the Jin, breaking the agreed upon truce. The Jin forces crossed the Yellow River in the winter of 1126–27 and laid siege to Kaifeng again. After heavy fighting, the Jin army succeeded in breaking Kaifeng's defenses and entered the city on 9 January 1127. The Song emperors Qinzong and Huizong were captured along with a host courtiers and family members in what is known as the Jingkang Incident. Huizong and Qinzong were demoted to commoners, forced to pay ritual obeisance to Aguda at his mausoleum, wear mourning dress, and were eventually enfeoffed as marquises with the titles of Muddle Virtue and Doubly Muddled. Huizong died in 1135 in Wuguocheng, a town near the Songhua River. Six Song princesses were married into the Wanyan clan. The Jin treated their Song royal hostages better over time in order to use them as a bargaining tool against the Southern Song. However this ended when Qinzong died in 1156, depriving the Jin of their primary hostage. The prince of Kang was enthroned as the new Song emperor (posthumously Emperor Gaozong of Song) and tried to organise resistance in regions that had not yet fallen to the Jin.

Due to anti-Jin resistance groups in numerous parts of northern China and the deaths of several Jin military leaders, including Zongwang, in the aftermath of the second campaign, the Jin were unable to immediately continue their conquests into Song territory. The Jin created the puppet state of Great Chu in the new territory they had conquered and placed Zhang Bangchang on the throne in Jiankang as their puppet ruler. The Jurchens hoped that by placing an ethnically Han ruler on the throne they could attract Han defectors from the Song. However Zhang was killed or forced to commit suicide on the orders of the Song dynasty soon after. The failure of the Song to defend Kaifeng in 1127 did not result in a cessation of conflict or the surrender of the Song. The Song court fled to Jiankang where they had removed the Jin puppet kingdom ruled by Zhang Bangchang and then abandoned it for Shaoxing.

The Jin set up another nominally Han-ruled puppet state called Great Qi under the emperorship of Liu Yu, a jinshi degree holder who had defected to the Jin in 1128. At first Great Qi was based at Daming in Hebei, but by 1132, Liu Yu had moved to Kaifeng. Liu Yu worked hard to establish a functioning administration and to revive northern China's stagnant economy but its population was forced to pay heavy taxes as well as perform compulsory military service. The ensuing battles between the Jin-Qi forces and the Song saw the first use of the fire lance, the predecessor of the hand cannon, at the Siege of De'an by the Song defenders in 1132. Great Qi's troops fought alongside the Jurchens and even succeeded in beating Song forces a few times, notably capturing Xiangyang in 1135. But this victory was short lived and the Song offensive led by Yue Fei in 1134–5 ended up recapturing much of the lost Song territory. This military defeat by the Song damaged Liu Yu's standing in the eyes of the Jurchens and brought the value of his position into question. Liu Yu's patron, Wuqimai, died in 1135 and was succeeded by Hela, a grandson of Emperor Taizu of Jin.

=== Xizong (1135–1150) ===
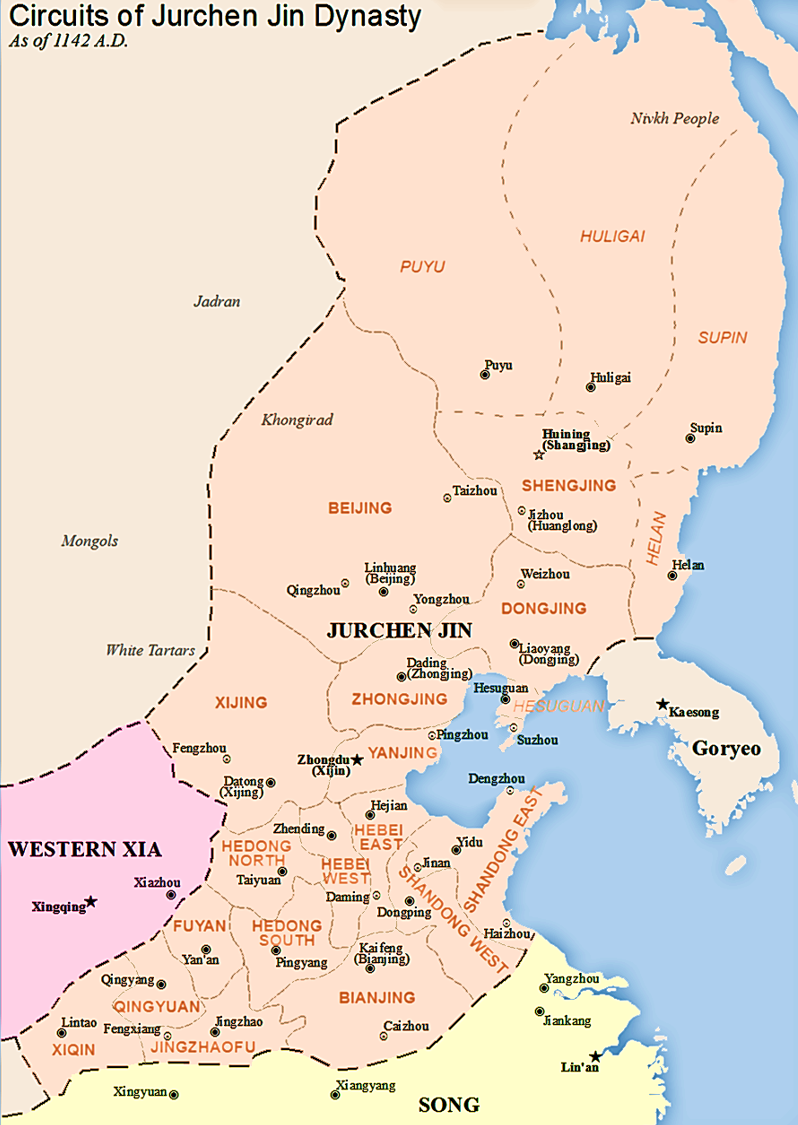
Administrative divisions of the Jin dynasty (1115-1234) in 1142 AD

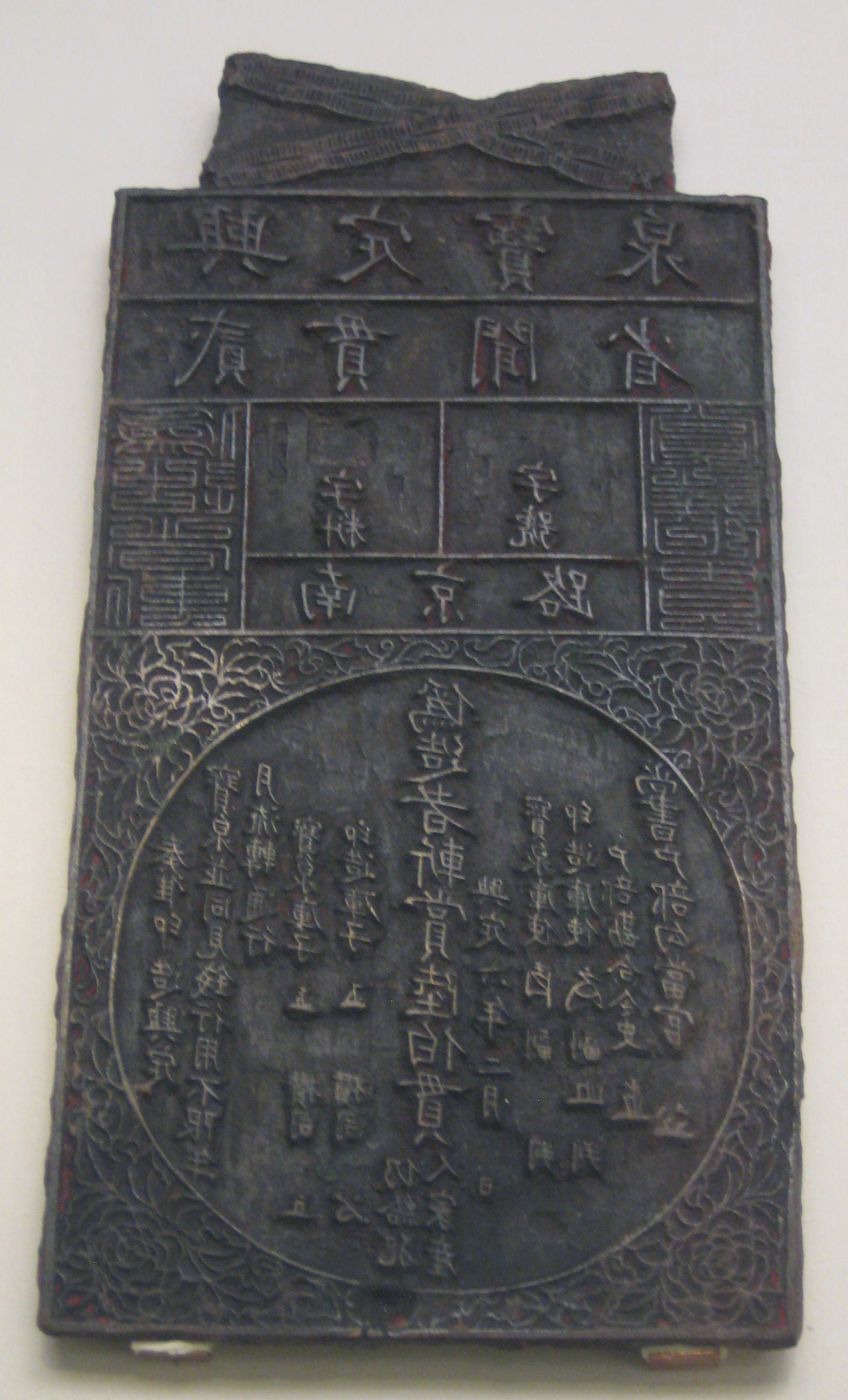
Bronze printing plate for Jin dynasty banknote, 1218

After Emperor Taizong of Jin died in 1135, he was succeeded by Hela (posthumously Emperor Xizong of Jin), a grandson of Emperor Taizu of Jin. Hela was much less favorable towards Liu Yu than his predecessor. He demoted Liu Yu from emperor of Great Qi to the rank of prince and abolished the state of Great Qi in 1137. Liu Yu lived out the rest of his life in supervised retirement at Linhuang.

A peace treaty with the Song was finalized on 11 October 1142. There was a preliminary peace in 1139 when the Jin returned Shaanxi and Henan to the Song but this was short lived. In 1140, the Jin retook Shaanxi and Henan and sent troops south of the Yellow River. The Southern Song court, based in Hangzhou since 1138, sought to appease the Jin by eliminating the revanchist faction. Due to the machinations of Qin Hui, who has the ears of the emperor, the Song general who had experienced the most success in fighting back against the Jin, Yue Fei, was put to death in 1141. In October 1141, the Jin general Wanyan Zongbi (Jin Wuzhu), the fourth son of Aguda, offered to make the Huai River the border between the two states. The Song agreed to the terms of the Treaty of Shaoxing, which stipulated that the entire course of the Huai River would become the new border, Tangzhou and Dengzhou would be ceded to the Jin, 250,000 ounces of silver and silk would be paid annually to the Jin as tribute, no garrisons could be constructed on the side of the Song border, and the Song would not pursue criminals north of the border but would surrender criminals to the Jin. In return, the Jin withdrew their armies and promised to return the coffin of Huizong and the empresses. The treaty was couched in terms of vassalage with the Jin addressed as "Your superior state" investing Emperor Gaozong of Song as ruler of the Song. With the finalization of the treaty, the Jin had fully conquered northern China and the Central Plains. The political and economic centre started shifting south as more Jurchens settling in northern China and larger numbers of Han Chinese were integrated into the state.

After taking over northern China, the Jin became increasingly sinicised. Over the span of 20 years, the new Jurchen ruling class constituted around half of a larger pattern of migration southward into northern China. There, many Jurchens were granted land, which was then organised around a social structure based on hereditary military units: a mouke ('company') was a unit consisting of 300 households, and groups of 7–10 moukes were further organised into meng-an ('battalions').

When Xizong was enthroned, he was only a boy of 16 years, and did not take part in much of the diplomatic and military activities that occurred immediately after his accession. Xizong left most of these affairs to the imperial clan members, who held the highest military and civilian offices. Despite his absence from the administration of the empire, the Jin remained relatively stable throughout his reign and did not face many urgent crises. Like the Song before them, the Jin sought to appease the northern nomads like the Mongols rather than to rule them directly. In 1146–7, the Jin invested Khabul Khan with the title of assisting state ruler of the Mongols. A Song record states that the Jin originally tried to use military force to defeat the Mongols but failed. Khabul was once invited to the Jin court. During the visit, Khabul tweaked the emperor's beard in a drunken outburst. While the emperor was initially willing to overlook this incident, he later changed his mind and ordered for Khabul to be captured. The Jin pursuers failed in the effort and were killed in an ambush. The Jin settled for sending elite troops to occupy a few strategic points before returning. After peaceful relations were established with the Mongols, the Jin sent them generous gifts as appeasement.

The Jin also tried to gain the submission of the Qara Khitai (Western Liao) offshoot of the Liao dynasty at the same time, however this effort came to nothing when the envoy was killed on his way west. The same envoy made contact with the Uyghurs of Qocho in 1144, but they remained aloof from the Jin and only sent local products as homage to the Jin court on an irregular basis.

Xizong adopted many Han Chinese cultural traditions and studied the classics and wrote Chinese poetry. Despite the increasing adoption of Han Chinese culture, the Jurchens continued to occupy the top echelons of Jin leadership positions. Later in his life, Xizong became an alcoholic, developed a persecution mania, and executed many officials for criticizing him. He also had Jurchen leaders who opposed him murdered, even those in the Wanyan clan. On 9 January 1150, he was murdered by a cabal of relatives and nobles, who made his cousin Wanyan Liang the next Jin emperor. Because of the brutality of both his domestic and foreign policy, Wanyan Liang was posthumously demoted from the position of emperor. Historians have consequently referred to him by his posthumous name "Prince of Hailing".

=== Wanyan Liang (1150–1161) ===
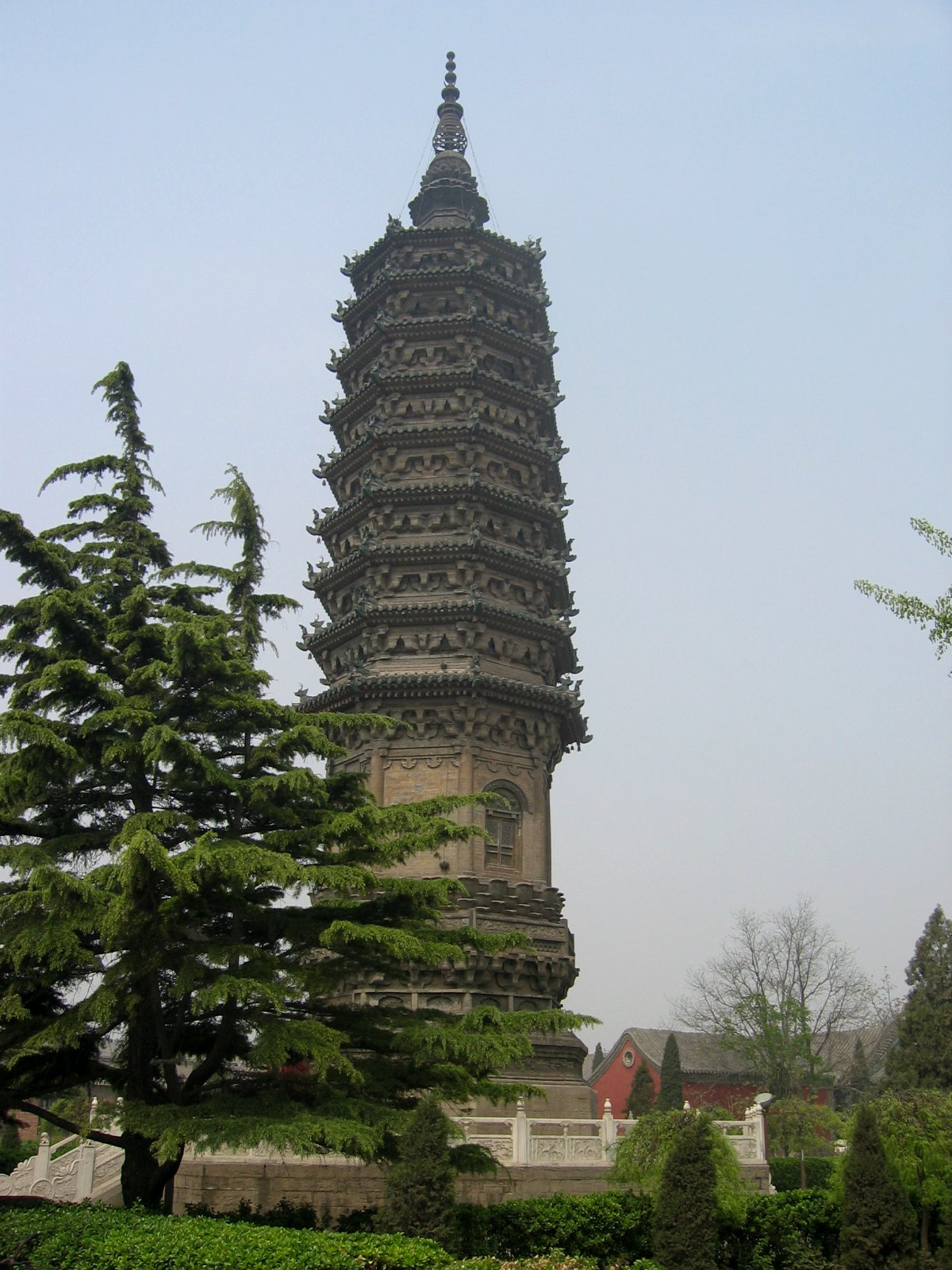
The Chengling Pagoda of Zhengding, Hebei, built between 1161 and 1189

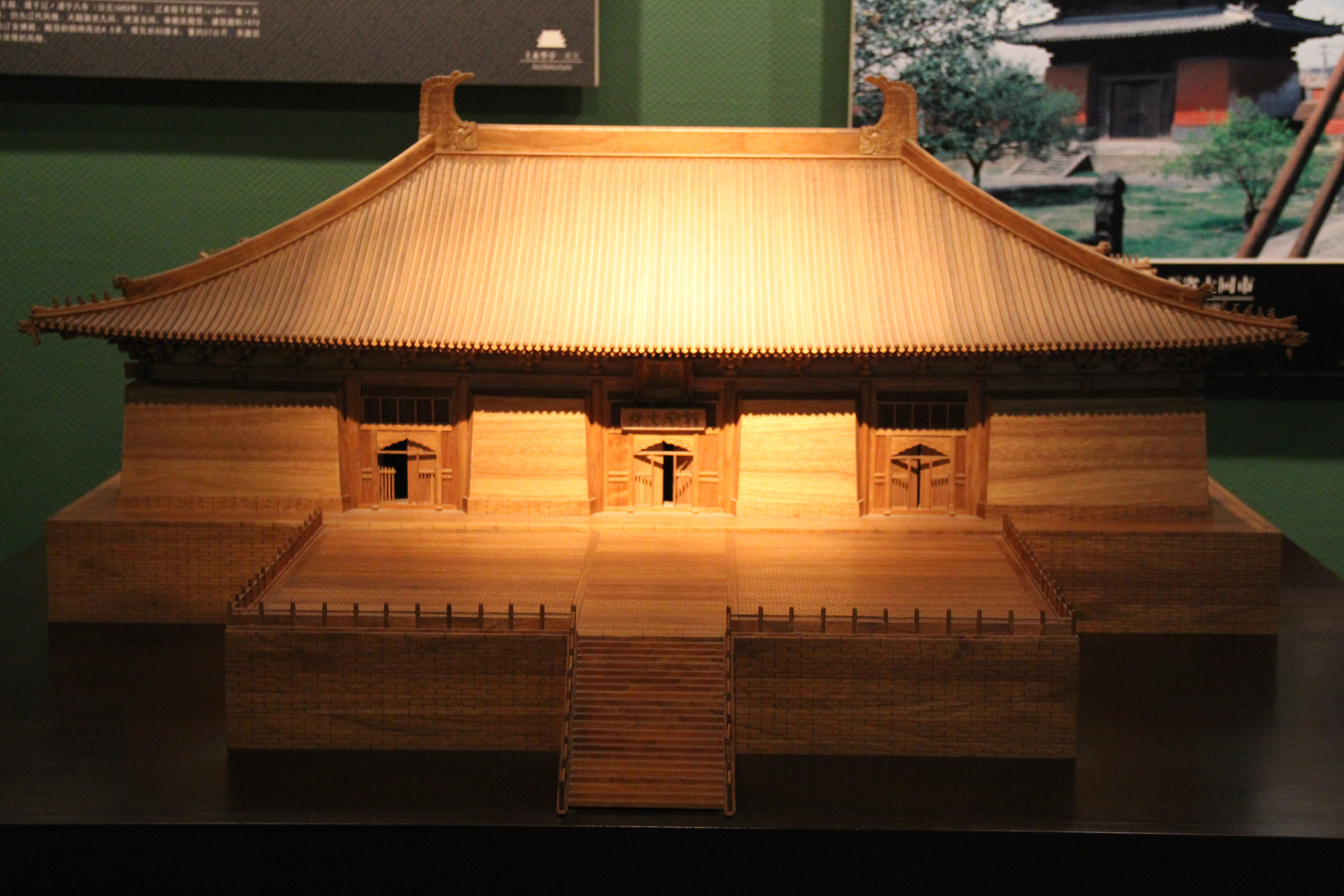
Jin wood structure (model)

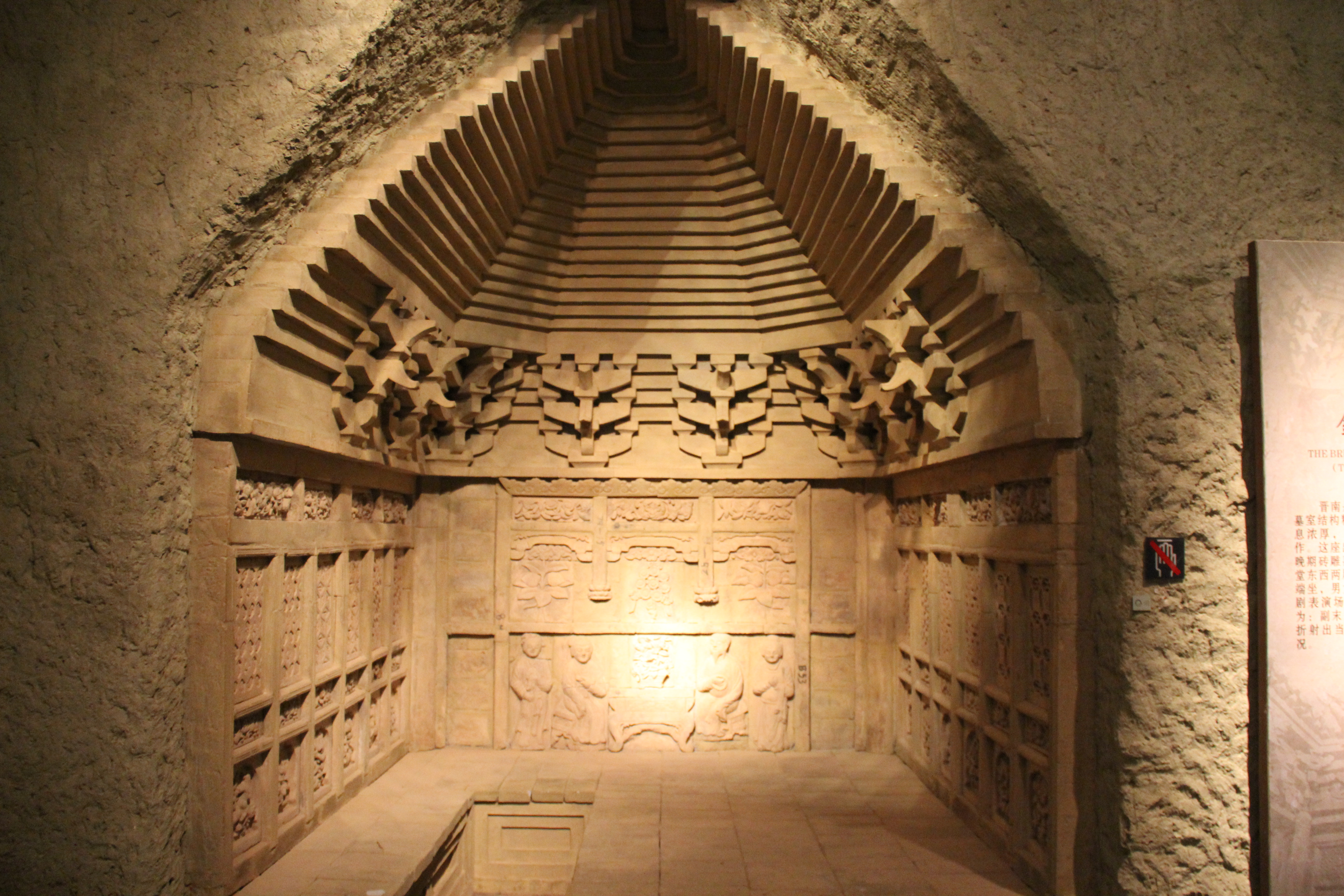
Jin tomb with stage scene

Having usurped the throne, Wanyan Liang embarked on a program of legitimization to ensure his rule as an emperor of China. In the process he became known as a monster, according to both Song and Jin sources, who was far worse than his predecessor. He normalized the killing of his opponents, including those among the Wanyan royal clan, particularly the descendants of Taizong. In total, he executed 155 princes. After killing them, Liang transferred the widows and concubines of the murdered princes to his own harem. In later centuries, he became the subject of pornography where he was portrayed as an anti-hero and his exploits described with gusto.

As part of Liang's efforts to legitimize himself as emperor, he became thoroughly entrenched in Chinese traditions. In his youth, he was highly impressed by the Song Chinese he came into contact with and their influence caused him to adopt Chinese practices such as drinking tea and playing chess. His predilection for Chinese culture was so strong during his childhood that he was given the nickname of Boliehan, which in the Jurchen language means "aping the Chinese". Liang initiated reforms to make the Jin more Chinese in ritual, ceremony, fiscal policy, and administration. He was no longer satisfied with the northern base of political power in the Supreme Capital (Shangjing) in Huining Prefecture (present day Acheng, Harbin), considering the region to be too underdeveloped for his liking. He started shifting the bureaucracy to Yanjing (modern Beijing) in the south. In 1152, Liang relocated his residence to Yanjing and renamed it the Central Capital. To emphasize the permanence of the move, in 1157 he ordered the destruction of the palaces and mansions of the Jurchen chiefs in the Supreme Capital and reduced it in rank to a prefecture. He also gave orders to reconstruct the former Song capital, Bianjing (present-day Kaifeng), and made it the Southern Capital.

Liang's vision of himself as a Chinese emperor extended to his ambition to control all of China, including the territory of the Song dynasty. To fulfil his dream of becoming the ruler of all China, Wanyan attacked the Song in 1161. In 1158, he accused the Song of breaking the Shaoxing Treaty by making illicit purchases of horses at the border markets. Preparations for an all out invasion of the Song started in 1159. He dispatched the minister of war to inspect the border with the Western Xia to make sure no border unrest could upset the campaign against the Song. Horses were requisitioned in great numbers and a total of 560,000 animals were reported to have been utilized for the war effort. A large store of weaponry was gathered in the Central Capital. A mandatory draft for the Han population was implemented, which was met with local resistance and rebellions in the south, particularly on the border with the Song dynasty. However, recruitment efforts continued until the summer of 1161. Anticipating combat with the Song navy and the need for river transport, Liang recruited 30,000 sailors and confiscated a great number of barges for his army.

In the summer of 1161, Wanyan Liang personally led his army from the Central Capital to the Southern Capital and killed all the surviving male descendants of the Yelü clan of the Liao dynasty and the House of Zhao of the Song dynasty. Over 130 persons were killed during the purge. Liang's purge of the Liao royal clan caused the Khitans to rebel, and 10,000 soldiers were forced to be diverted to quell the rebellion in the northeast. Liang also killed Empress Tudan for criticizing his campaign against the Song. Another rebellion broke out in the former Supreme Capital at Huining Prefecture led by Liang's cousin, the soon-to-be crowned Wanyan Yong.

There was no formal declaration of war against the Song. As late as 14 June 1161, Jin envoys were at the Song court congratulating Gaozong on his birthday. However one of the envoys behaved in a belligerent manner, alerting the Song to Jin plans to attack them. The Jin envoy was executed and the Song strengthened their border defenses in time for the invasion. Wanyan Liang concentrated his forces on the northern bank of the Huai River. He left the Southern Capital on 15 October and crossed the Huai on 28 October, advancing toward the Yangtze. The Song forces reinforced their line of defence on the Yangtze and pro-actively attacked the Jin in some locales, notably scoring a few successes to the west and conquering some Jin prefectures.

On 16 November, the Jin suffered a major defeat against the Song at sea. The Jin fleet was composed of over 600 large ships, 20,000 Jurchen and Balhae troops, 10,000 northern Han troops, and 40,000 sailors. They were sighted off of Chenjia island while waiting for reinforcements before sailing down to attack Hangzhou. On 15 November, the Jin fleet was spotted anchored off of Tang island (south of Qingdao). The Jin ships were anchored when the Song fleet moved to attack them. Despite adverse weather conditions causing delays in the Song attack, the Jin ships made no move to retaliate because all the sailors were Chinese conscripts. They lied to the Jin officers and told them that the approaching Song ships were actually reinforcements. When the Song ships started launching bombs and fire arrows at the rigging of the Jin ships, they were taken completely by surprise. The silk sails of the ships caught fire, causing panic and desertion among the crew and soldiers, who jumped ship or surrendered. The Jin ships moored further away raised anchor and fled to sea while the Song navy led by Li Bao gave chase. The inferior Jin ships, built for rivers and lakes, were slower than the Song vessels, and were captured one by one. Over 10,000 Jin forces drowned and another 3,000 Han conscripts in the Jin army surrendered to the Song troops upon reaching shore. Other Jurchen and Balhae troops died when their ships ran aground against the rocky shores. It was said that burning ships could be seen for 200 li (97 kilometres or 60 miles). According to Jin sources, half of the Jin navy was lost in the Battle of Tangdao, including high ranking commanders such as Wanyan Zhengjianu.

While Liang was camped at Yangzhou, some of his generals tried to cross the Yangtze at Caishi (south of Ma'anshan). The attempted crossing on 26 and 27 November failed. The paddle-wheel ships of the Song navy launched gunpowder bombs known as thunderclap bombs at the Jin ships, causing a cloud of sulphur to blind the Jin forces. The Song ships then went forth and drowned the men and horses trying to cross. This engagement, known as the Battle of Caishi, was viewed as a major victory by Song sources, with references to large numbers of Jin forces numbering in the hundreds of thousands. However, the battle was likely a relatively small engagement and the Jin lost no more than 4,000 men.

Wanyan Liang's campaign came to an end when he was murdered along with five of his concubines in his camp on 15 December 1161. Liang's son and heir was also killed in the capital. The assassins were a group of officers who had grown disillusioned with Liang's defeats. There was widespread dissatisfaction with his rule not just among the minority groups, but also within the elite Jurchen class. Liang's cousin, Wulu (posthumously Emperor Shizong of Jin), had already been crowned emperor in Liaoyang by the conspirators on 27 October one and a half month prior to Liang's death.

=== Shizong (1161–1189) ===
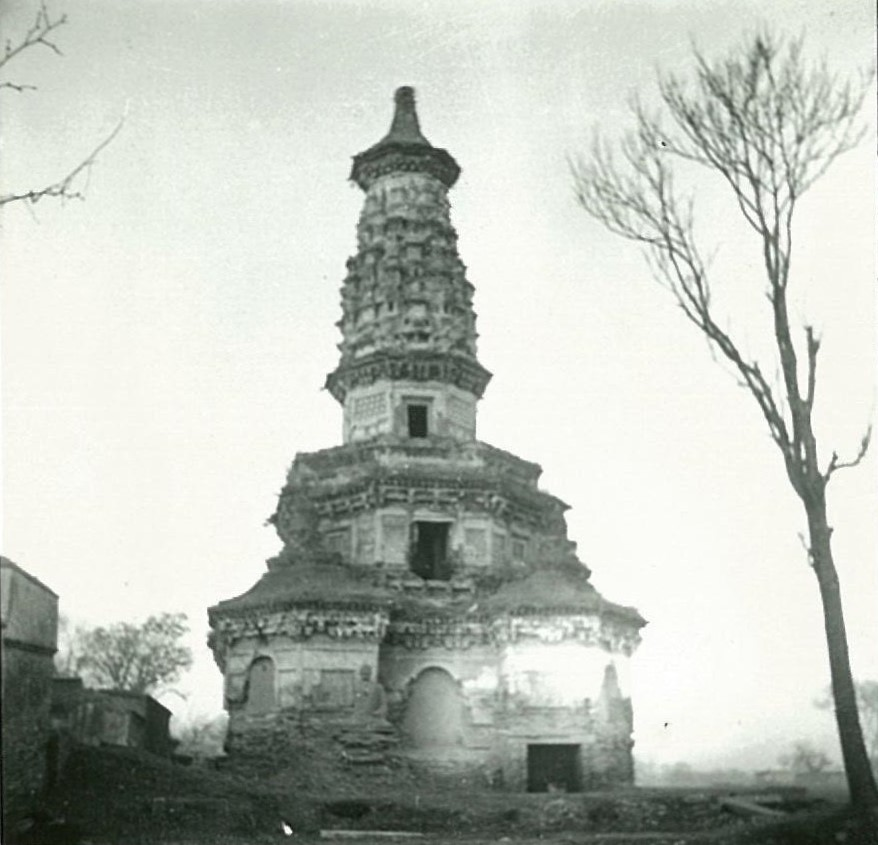
The Guanghui Temple Huatai Pagoda in 1939; built in the Tang dynasty, was destroyed and rebuilt during the Dading period (1161–1189) of the Jin dynasty

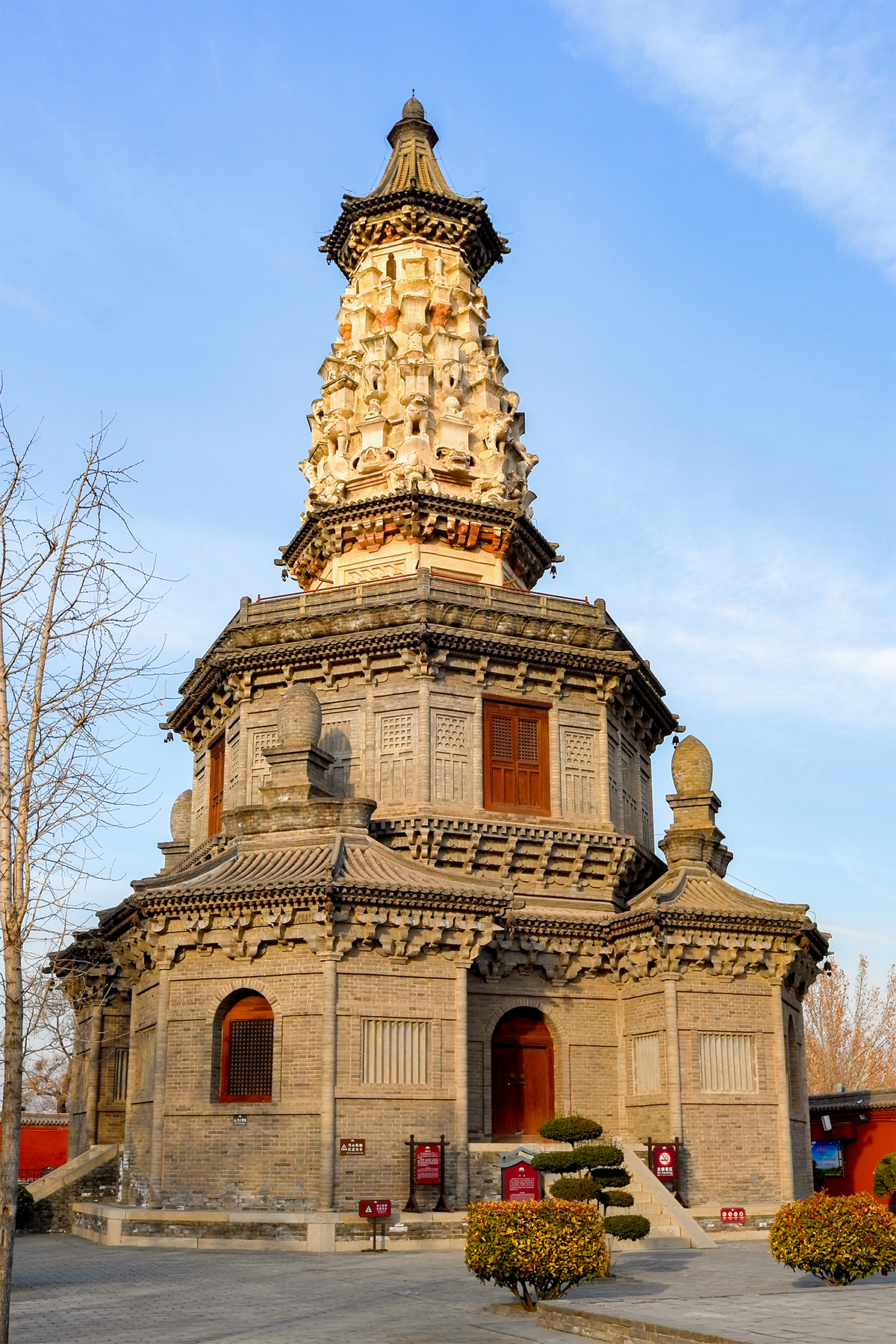
The Guanghui Temple Huatai Pagoda in modern times

The new emperor, Wulu, also known as Yong (posthumously Emperor Shizong of Jin), was not officially recognized as emperor until the murder of Wanyan Liang's heir. He was the grandson of Taizu and the son of Wanyan Zongfu and a Balhae consort. Prior to his accession as emperor, Shizong was stationed in the Eastern Capital (Liaoyang) as the city's vice-regent. When a Khitan rebellion in the region broke out in 1161, Shizong took part in the anti-rebel campaign and was able to bring them back under control. Khitans also rebelled in the northwest but they were defeated by 1162. Some Khitans escaped to the Song while others in the Jin military were disbanded or spread out among Jurchen units. County towns in the northwest were fortified against further rebellions and to protect the region from the Mongols. During the 1150s or 1160s, the Jin captured the Mongol khan Ambaghai of the Taichiud, who was duped in a ruse by the Tatars. Ambaghai was nailed to a wooden donkey and left to die.

Supported primarily by Balhae people and Jurchens dissatisfied with Wanyan Liang's rule, Shizong left for the Central Capital (modern Beijing) after he was proclaimed emperor. His first order in 1162 was to withdraw the army from the Yangtze region and in spring he sent envoys to the Song seeking peace. There were repeated clashes with the Song both in the Huai River region and in the southwest region bordering the Song province of Shu (Sichuan) until 1165, when a peace treaty was concluded on more favorable terms for the Song. The Song was no longer a vassal of the Jin and the word "tribute" was replaced with "payment", however the actual amount paid to the Jin remained unchanged. The border between the two states remained the same as before. The Treaty of Longxing ushered in 40 years of peace between the Song and Jin dynasties.

Although educated in the Chinese classics, Shizong was not as infatuated with Chinese culture as his predecessor, Wanyan Liang. He had a great nostalgia for the traditional Jurchen lifestyle of those who still lived in their ancestral homelands. He saw the increasingly Chinese way of life that the Jurchens adopted as a concerning development, so he passed edicts prohibiting them from adopting Chinese names or dress. He promoted the Jurchen language and culture; during his reign, a number of Chinese classics were translated into Jurchen, the Imperial Jurchen Academy was founded, and the imperial examinations started to be offered in the Jurchen language. The old centre of power in Huining Prefecture was rebuilt and returned to its former status as Supreme Capital. In 1184–5, Shizong spent a year in the Supreme Capital to reminisce about his forefathers.

In the early 1180s, Shizong instituted a restructuring of 200 meng'an units to remove tax abuses and help Jurchens. Communal farming was encouraged. The Jin Empire prospered and had a large surplus of grain in reserve. Poor Jurchen families in the southern Routes (Daming and Shandong) Battalion and Company households tried to live the lifestyle of wealthy Jurchen families and avoid doing farming work by selling their own Jurchen daughters into slavery and renting their land to Han tenants. The wealthy Jurchens feasted and drank and wore damask and silk. The History of Jin says that Shizong took note and attempted to halt this behaviour in 1181. Shizong's reign was remembered as a time of comparative peace and prosperity, and the emperor himself was compared to the mythological rulers Yao and Shun.

=== Zhangzong (1189–1208) ===
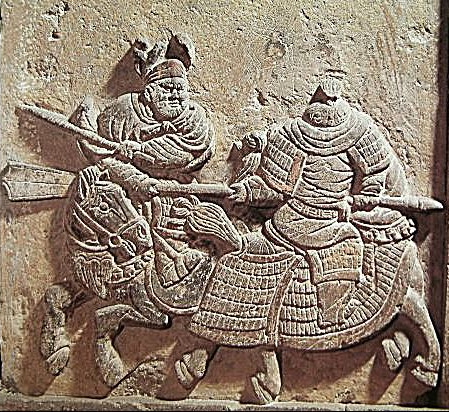
Depiction of a duel between Song and Jin horsemen

By the time Shizong died in 1189, the crown prince and heir apparent Wanyan Yungong had already passed, so his grandson Madage (posthumously Emperor Zhangzong of Jin) succeeded him. The new emperor did not have as strong of a personality as his grandfather but was still able to maintain the unity of the Wanyan clan and the Jurchen noblemen. His reign saw the continued adoption of Chinese culture by the Jurchens and Khitans despite prohibitions against such behaviour. Despite brewing trouble to the north with the rise of Genghis Khan, the main source of disaster during Zhangzong's reign was the 1194 Yellow River flood which inundated vast regions and formed two new courses. The flooding displaced farmers, disrupted communication, and fomented unrest among the population, causing the decline of the dynasty. In addition to the flooding, there were droughts and locusts plaguing the regions bordering the Song. Shandong in particular was heavily affected by natural disasters. At the same time, the Jin had to contend with the rising Mongols, forcing them to construct large scale fortifications along the northwestern border after 1192. The Jin also spent a significant portion of their resources on sending punitive expeditions into Mongol territory during the Yellow River flood. To raise more funds, the Jin government resorted to confiscating land from Han owners accused of tax evasion and redistributing the land to reliable Jurchens, causing friction between the two populations.

In 1195, the Jin attacked the Khongirad in conjunction with the Tatars but fallout over the distribution of loot caused the Jin to attack the Tatars in the following year. A Jin vanguard force led by Wanyan Anguo held off the Tatars on the Kherlen River for three days before reinforcements arrived and defeated them. Conflict with the Khongirad reignited on 4 February 1196 when they invaded Jin territory and defeated a Jin detachment. Meanwhile the Tatars fleeing Jin forces were defeated by Toghrul and Temüjin. Toghrul and Temüjin met with Jin officials who awarded them with titles. One of the officials, a Khitan named Yelü Ahai, later joined Temüjin along with his brother Tuhua in 1203. The defeated Tatar Zuxu submitted to the Jin and rebelled again before submitting again in 1198. Zuxu soon died afterward.

In the south, the Song court was well aware of the Jin's difficulties. Song embassies travelled to the Central Capital twice a year and passed through the disaster struck regions. Song military leaders started instigating conflict on the Huai River border starting from 1204. The Song chancellor Han Tuozhou encouraged Song raids and military intrusions into Jin territory. By the summer of 1206, Han had decided it was time to formally declare war on the Jin. The deputy minister of war, Ye Shi, was tasked with drafting the declaration of war. However, he refused due to his opposition to the war. Ye Shi was demoted and replaced by Li Bi, who was a part of Han's revanchist party. The formal declaration of war was officially announced on 14 June 1206.

The Song deployed 160,000 men along the Huai River while the Jin mobilized 135,000 men to defend the border in December 1206. The Song offensive failed to make any significant headway against Jin defenses. Aside from capturing the relatively undefended border town of Sizhou on the northern bank of the Huai, the Song forces were completely ineffective at taking Jin defended positions. The campaign was badly organised and beset by heavy rains, which flooded their camp and destroyed the hay for their horses. Provisions also did not arrive on time so that soldiers suffered from hunger. Due to the harsh weather, the soldiers of the Song army starting deserting in the tens of thousands. By the autumn of 1206, the momentum had reversed and the Jin armies were able to take several Song prefectural towns, penetrating deep into Song territory. Rather than the large scale defection of Han people that the Song had hoped for, the Song governor-general of Shu (Sichuan), Wu Xi, defected to the Jin in December 1206. This would have been a major loss due to the number of soldiers that he commanded (70,000), but a group of loyal officers murdered Wu Xi on 29 March 1207 and returned Shu to Song control. Having narrowly averted disaster, the war continued with no major decisive engagements after April 1207.

Han Tuozhou was dismissed from the Song court and murdered on 27 November 1207. Peace negotiations during the second half of 1207 and in 1208 were expedited by pressures on both sides. The Jin were worried about trouble to their north with the Mongols and the revanchist faction in the Song court had lost power. The Jin mainly blamed the conflict on Han, whom they regarded as a "war criminal". In July 1208, the Jin announced an end to the war and a peace treaty with the Song was finalized on 2 November 1208. Annual payments by the Song to the Jin were raised by 50,000 ounces of silver and 50,000 bolts of textiles. Han Tuozhou's head was delivered to the Jin in a box and preserved with lacquer. The head was placed on display in the Jin imperial family's ancestral temple.

Zhangzong died on 29 December 1208, having successfully overseen peaceful relations restored with the Song. During his reign, he sought to convert the Jin state into something more similar to the Tang and Song dynasties. In 1202, Zhangzong promulgated the Taihe Code to unify existing legislations. In the same year, he formally claimed the power of the Earth element on the wuxing cycle. This symbolic act formally placed the Jin as the successor of the Song and signaled to the world that the Jin considered itself the legitimate ruler of All Under Heaven.

=== Wanyan Yongji (1208–1213) ===
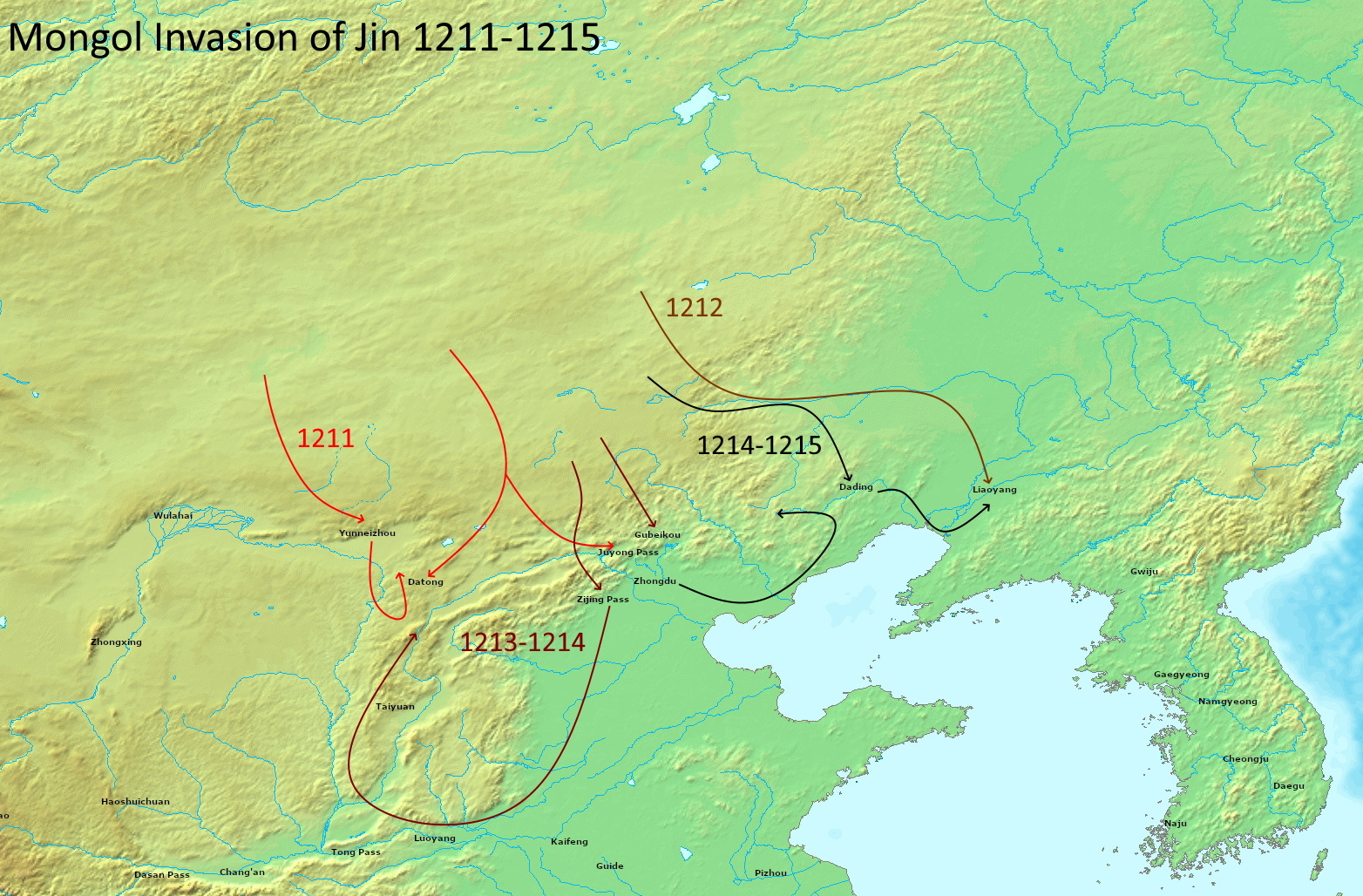
Mongol invasion of the Jin dynasty (1211–1215)

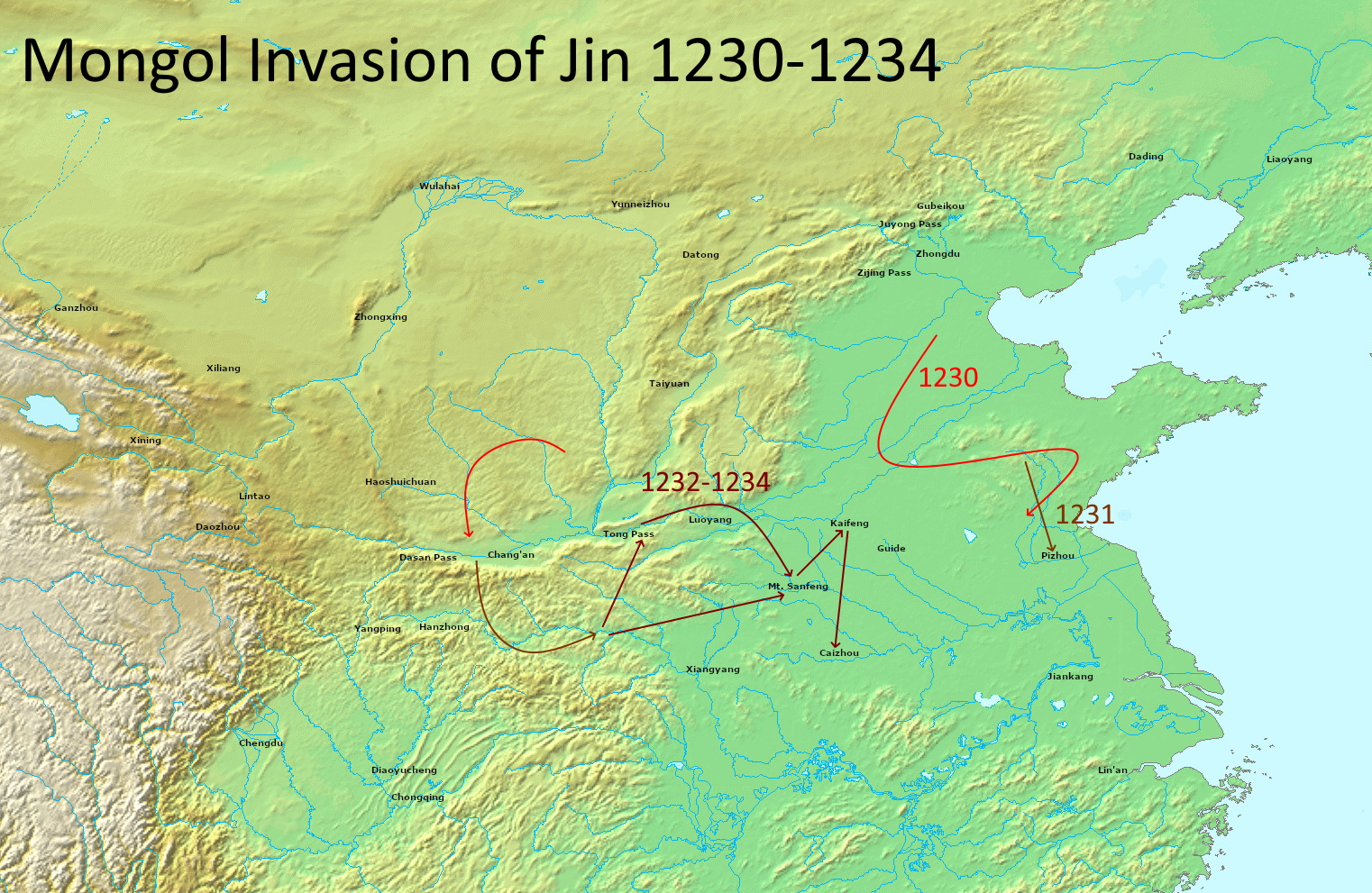
Mongol conquest of the Jin dynasty (1230–1234)

When Emperor Zhangzong died in 1208, he was succeeded by Shizong's seventh son, Wanyan Yongji (originally Wanyan Yunji). Wanyan Yongji was born to a Balhae concubine and is not recorded in history as an emperor due to his successor, Emperor Xuanzong of Jin, reverting his status to that of a prince posthumously, therefore he is known as "Prince Shao of Wei" or "Prince Weishao". Yongji's succession was uncertain due to the seniority of Zhangzong's elder brother (Xuanzong), who should have succeeded Zhangzong according to tradition. However a court clique enthroned Yongji instead.

By the time Yongji came to power, the Jin had constructed a long line of fortifications from modern Qiqihar to Hulun Lake connecting with the previous Great Wall of China. However the units stationed along the fortifications were of Khitan and Kumo Xi extraction rather than Jurchen, making their worth of questionable value. It is uncertain why the Mongols under Genghis Khan invaded the Jin dynasty and numerous reasons are given, including the earlier killing of Ambaghai Khan (predecessor of Genghis) and Yongji personally insulting Genghis. Genghis broke off tributary relations with the Jin in 1210 and decided to invade them when he received news that the Jin were suffering from a severe famine.

In the spring of 1211, the Mongols attacked the Jin in two directions. The eastern army was led by Genghis. The Mongol forces led by Jochi, Ögedei, and Chagatai easily overcame the border fortifications of the Jin and took Juyong Pass. Jin reinforcements were easily defeated by the Mongols, who ravaged the countryside while the western army blocked Jin auxiliary troops in Shanxi from coming to the aid of their frontline forces. The Mongols withdrew in the winter.

The Mongols invaded the Jin again in 1212. In February, the Mongols took Huanzhou and besieged Zhengzhou. Yongji sent out an army led by Heshilie Jiujin, the commander of the Jurchen and Khitan cavalry, and Duji Qianjianu and Hu Sha, who led the Han Chinese infantry, against the Mongol invasion. The Jin army was said to have been several hundred thousand strong. The Khitan commanders advocated for a surprise attack, but Heshilie Jiujin preferred to advance as a whole with the entire army. He also sent a letter to Genghis denouncing him, alerting the Mongols to the Jin advance. Although heavily outnumbered, Mongol cavalry led by Muqali charged the Jin forces, discomforting their ranks. The Mongol main army then followed up with an attack on the Jin forces, chasing them for 48 kilometres (30 mi) before defeating their rearguard at Huihebao Fort. The Mongol victory at the Battle of Yehuling has been attributed to the overly cautious Jurchen commander, the disaffection of the Khitan commanders who resented Jurchen control, and the fighting qualities of the Mongol cavalry.

In the spring of 1212, the Mongols took Juyong Pass again and penetrated deep into Jin territory, devastating parts of Hebei, Shandong, and Shanxi. On 5 January 1213, Mongol forces led by Jebe took the Eastern Capital. Genghis defeated another Jin army led by Zhuhu Gaoqi in the summer of 1213. On 31 March 1214, Genghis laid siege to the Central Capital.

During the Mongol invasion, Wanyan Yongji was killed in a coup by Heshilie Hushahu, who had been commander of the Western Capital, which had already fallen to the Mongols. One of the reasons Hushahu killed Yongji in the summer of 1213 was that he feared repercussions for his failure to defend the areas under his command from the Mongols. Hushahu enthroned Wudubu (posthumously Emperor Xuanzong of Jin), the elder brother of Zhangzong and nephew of Yongji.

=== Xuanzong (1213–1224) ===
Map of the Jin dynasty (1115–1234).png

The events of Wanyan Yongji's death and the accession of Wudubu (posthumously Emperor Xuanzong of Jin) happened while the Mongols were advancing toward the Central Capital. Repeated droughts had severely impacted the Jin dynasty's ability to wage war and muster troops. In a last ditch effort, the Jin court removed all limitations on its population's ability to take office, lifting former restrictions on the Khitans and Han. However this came to naught and the Jin started negotiations with the Mongols in the spring of 1214. The Mongols agreed to withdraw in return for the Jin submitting as a tributary and sending a daughter (Princess Qiguo) of the former emperor in marriage to the khan.

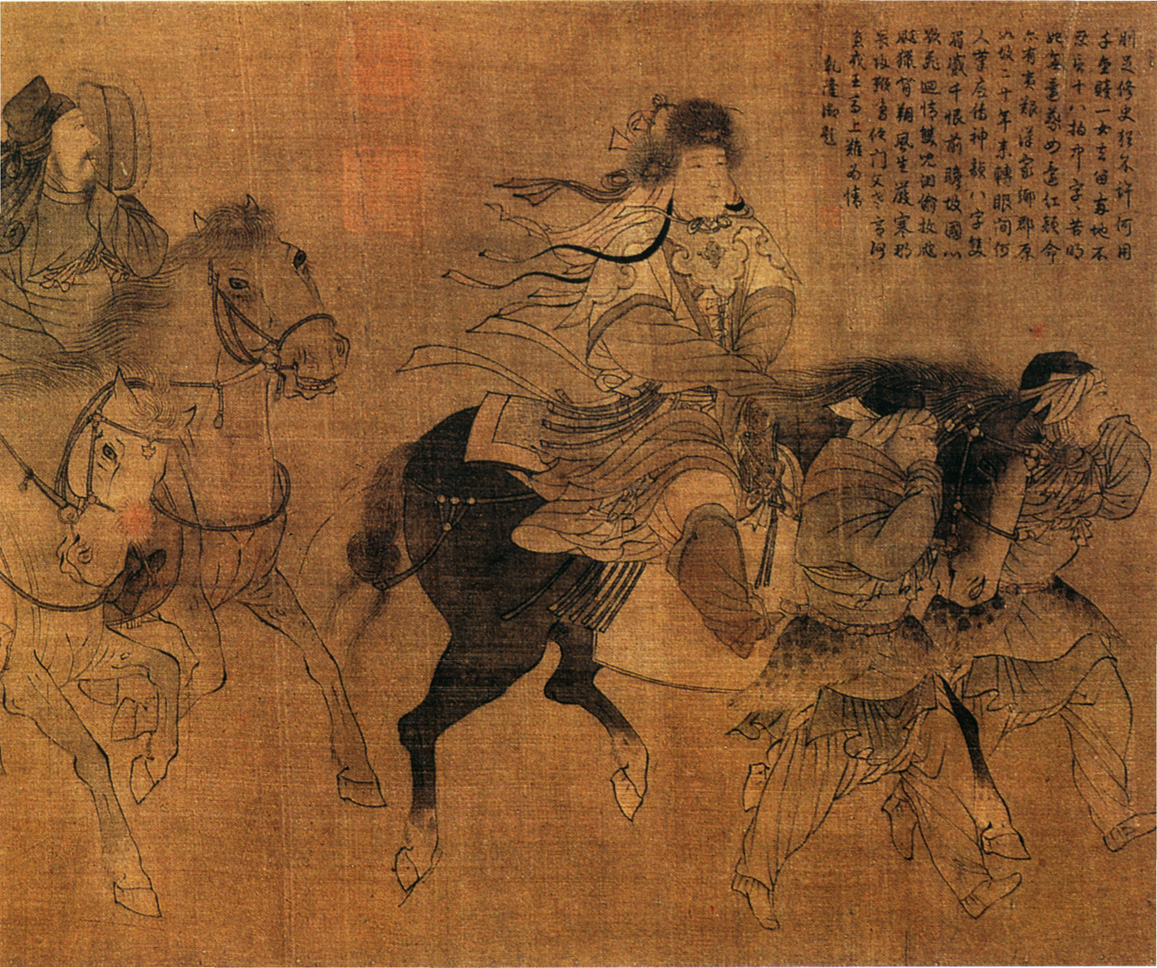
Cai Wenji returning to Han, Jin dynasty painting

Despite the momentary peace, Xuanzong judged the situation in the north to be too precarious to remain at the Central Capital and relocated the court to the Southern Capital, which was located in the centre of the agriculturally developed Chinese plains and defended to the north by the Yellow River. Genghis saw the relocation as casus belli for the continuation of the war. By December 1214, Muqali's Mongol forces had taken the northeastern portion of the Jin dynasty while the Central Capital fell to the Mongols on 31 May 1215. The Khitan and Han subjects of the Jin dynasty defected to the Mongols, who placed the Khitan Shimo Ming'an and Jabar Khoja in charge of the Central Capital. At the same time the Jin and Western Xia came into conflict in the west while the Song refused to pay the sum stipulated in the 1208 treaty. The Mongols created a Han army out of defecting Jin troops, and another army out of defected Song troops called the "Newly Submitted Army" (新附軍). Two Han leaders, Shi Tianze and Liu Heima, and the Khitan Xiao Zhala defected and commanded the three tumens in the Mongol army.

In Shandong, a rebellion led by Yang Anguo, a man descended from a line of boot and leather workers, plundered the country towns in the east. In the summer of 1214, Yang proclaimed himself emperor. Despite the ongoing Mongol invasion, the Jin mobilized an army to put down the rebellion. The Jin forces led by Pusan Anchen had destroyed most of Yang's strongholds by late autumn. Yang was captured and killed in early 1215. Another two rebel leaders were defeated in the anti-rebel campaign, but general unrest in Shandong continued to incite rebellions. The rebels coalesced into a group known as the Red Coats in 1215. The Jin were unable to defeat them and in 1217, another Yellow River flood prevented them from taking action in Shandong. The Song tried to use the Red Coats to their advantage by offering their leaders official and material assistance. In 1218, the Song appointed the rebel leader Li Quan as commanding prefect of Shandong. In 1225, the Mongols invaded Shandong, resulting in the surrender of Li Quan in 1227. Li Quan joined the Mongols in attacking the Song in 1230 but the invasion ended in failure and Li Quan was killed on 18 February 1231. Li Quan's adopted son, Li Tan, inherited his father's position and defected to the Song in 1262, for which Kublai Khan had him executed.

In the northeast, the Khitan prince Yelü Liuge, who had been serving the Jin as a military commander, rebelled and seized a portion of Liaodong in 1211. Two years later he proclaimed himself the ruler of the Liao. Yelü Liuge was ousted by his younger brother, Yelü Sibu, and requested help from Genghis Khan against the usurper. Sibu was also usurped by one of his ministers, Yelü Qinu. The rebel Khitan state was destroyed by the Mongols in 1233. In 1214, the Jin assigned Puxian Wannu to suppress the rebellion. However Puxian Wannu was defeated and he himself rebelled in 1215. Based in the Eastern Capital (Liaoyang), Puxian Wannu declared the state of Dazhen ("Great Jurchen") and overran most of the former northeastern territory of the Jin dynasty, including the former Supreme Capital on the Songhua River. In the spring of 1216, Khitans fleeing from the Jin overran Puxian Wannu's territory and held the area from Dengzhou to Poju (Uiju).

In 1216, the Mongols accompanied by Yelü Liuge chased the Khitan rebels to the Goryeo borders and launched an attack on Dafuying, located on an island in the lower course of the Yalu River. The Khitans requested help from Goryeo but when the request was denied, the Khitans crossed the Yalu with an estimated 90,000 men and overran the Goryeo frontier. The Khitan rebels spent 1217 pillaging southwards down the Korean peninsula before several defeats at the hand of Korean General Kim Ch'wiryŏ forced them to retreat. They turned their attention back toward the territory of Puxian Wannu. Puxian Wannu had already been defeated by the Mongols and submitted, but when the Mongol forces withdrew, he moved further east toward the Yalu and in early 1217, declared the state of Dongxia ("Eastern Xia"). Pressured by the Jin, he fled eastward again to the lower reaches of the Tumen River. It was also there that the Khitans fled from Goryeo. The Khitans were able to gather reinforcements and then invaded Goryeo again in the fall of 1217. The Khitan invasion was halted after they took the city of Kangdong, where Goryeo forces managed to contain them.

In the winter of 1218, 10,000 Mongol troops commanded by Hazhen and Zhala accompanied by 20,000 Eastern Jurchen troops commanded by Wanyan Ziyuan entered Goryeo from the northeast. They defeated Khitan forces in the cities of Hwaju, Maengju, Sunju, and Tŏkchu. The Mongol-Jurchen advance was stopped by a heavy snowfall that made the roads impassable. Hazhen sent a letter carried by the translator Zhao Zhongxiang to Cho Ch'ung, the Goryeo commander in charge of the northwest, requesting provisions and demanding the two nations enter an Elder-Younger Brother relationship after the subjugation of the Khitans. Cho Ch'ung and Kim Ch'wiryŏ were in favour of meeting the Mongol demands but the Goryeo court was more apprehensive. Ultimately they agreed to provide for the Mongol forces at the urging of Cho. One thousand bushels of rice and one thousand picked troops were sent to the Mongols. They arrived in time to witness the Mongols assault the Khitans in the walled-city of Taeju. The reinforcements were received well by the Mongols. In early 1219, preparations were underway to take the last Khitan stronghold in Kangdong. Troops from Goryeo joined the Mongol-Jurchen force. An estimated 50,000 Khitans surrendered and opened the gates.

After the fall of Kangdong, Goryeo sent a delegation to Zhala's camp as well as gifts to the Mongol commanders. Mongol envoys met with Gojong of Goryeo (reigned 1213–1259) and handed him a document without the usual formalities. Cho accompanied the Mongol and Jurchen commanders to the Yalu where the Mongols seized a large number of Goryeo horses and left. The Mongols started collecting tribute from Goryeo and left behind 41 subordinates in Poju to learn the Korean language.

Conditions in northwestern Goryeo were poor following the Khitan raids. In the autumn of 1219, military commanders Han Sun and Ta Chi rebelled in Poju and defected to Puxian Wannu, who augmented their forces with 10,000 Eastern Jurchens. They tried to make an alliance with the Jin commander Yugexia. Yugexia invited them to a feast and killed them. Their heads were sent to Kaesong in early 1220 for which Yugexia was rewarded greatly by the Goryeo court. However Yugexia repeatedly sacked Goryeo's border cities for several years afterward. Troops sent to Poju to restore order slew so many that another rebellion occurred four months later that required 5,000 troops to put down. Khitans who had fled into the mountains continued to raid Goryeo garrisons. Yugexia later contributed 5,000 soldiers to the defence of Goryeo against the Mongols in 1231.

In 1224, Puxian Wannu declared independence from the Mongols and sent envoys to Goryeo to establish an alliance. Goryeo rejected the offer and over the next four years, Eastern Jurchens raided Goryeo. An attempt at peace negotiations was made in 1229 due to deteriorating relations between the Mongols and Goryeo. When the Mongols ordered Goryeo to attack Puxian Wannu, Goryeo did not comply. Puxian Wannu was defeated by the Mongols in 1233 shortly before the Jin dynasty was conquered in 1234.

By the end of Xuanzong's reign in 1224, The Mongol invasions and rebellions had reduced the Jin dynasty to a small state surrounding the Yellow River. The Jin tried to make up for their losses in the north by invading the Song in 1217 but failed to make much headway. The Western Xia also attacked the Jin in the west but also failed to make much headway against Jin defenses. A series of border battles over towns around the Huai River region ensued that resulted in some small gains for the Jin but no diplomatic concessions from the Song. Xuanzong died in 1223 and was succeeded by his third son, Ningjiasu.

=== Aizong (1224–1234) ===
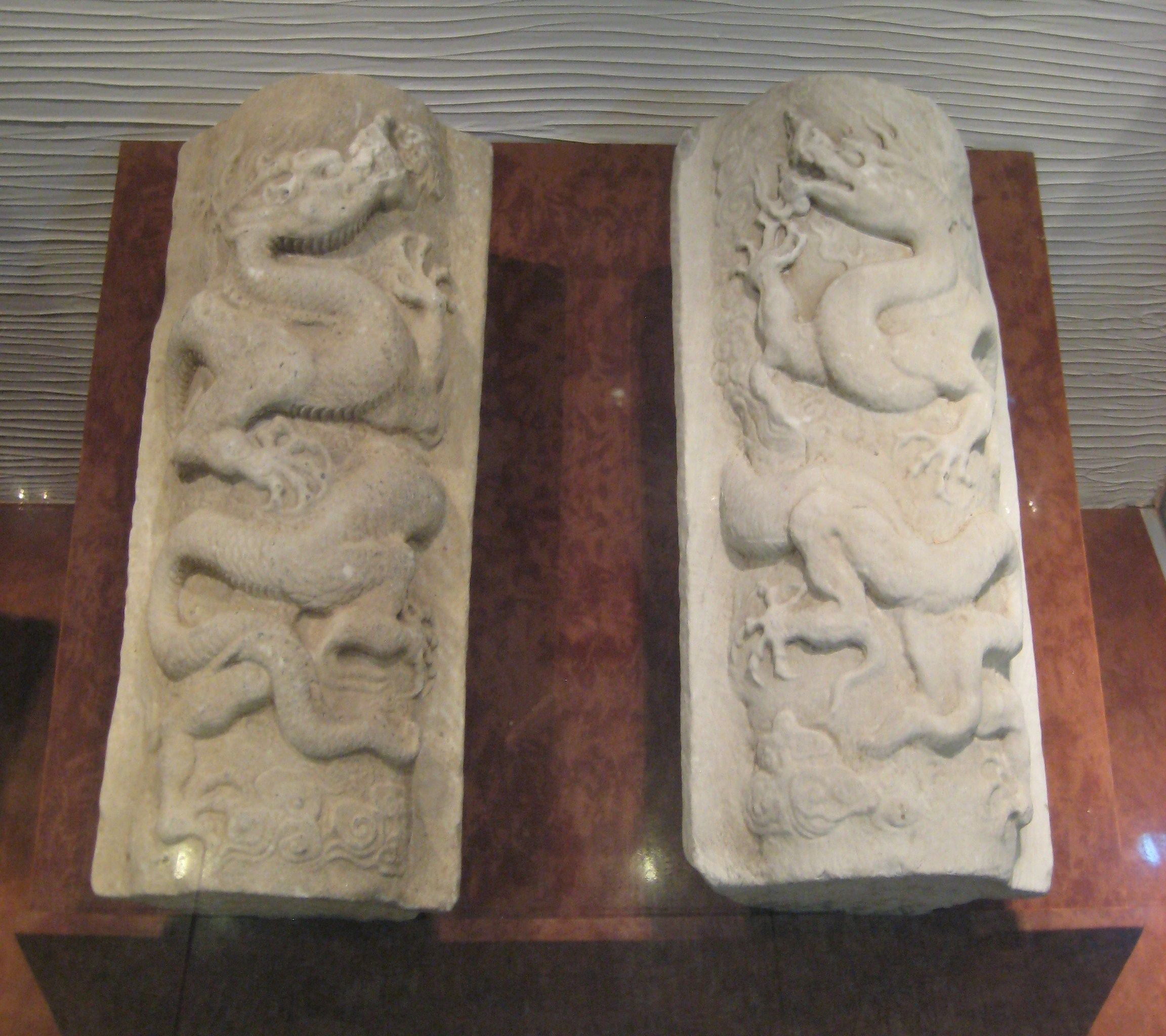
Jin dynasty dragon columns in Beijing

Ningjiasu, posthumously Emperor Aizong of Jin, succeeded his father, Emperor Xuanzong of Jin, in 1224. His posthumous name, Aizong, means "Pitiable Ancestor", representing his role as the last emperor of the Jin dynasty. Upon Aizong's accession, the Jin had lost all territory north of the Yellow River.

Aizong made peace with the Song in 1224 and formally renounced their claim to annual payments from the Song. A peace treaty with the Western Xia was concluded in 1225 acknowledging that the Western Xia was no longer a vassal of the Jin.

When Genghis Khan died in 1227, Aizong tried to appease the Mongols with an embassy offering their condolences, but the Mongols refused to receive their envoys. In 1230 and 1231, Ögedei Khan launched another invasion of the Jin dynasty, attacking them from two directions under the personal command of Ögedei and Genghis' youngest son Tolui. The combined army, led by Subutai, crossed the Yellow River on 28 January 1232 and reached Bianjing (Kaifeng) on 6 February. The Siege of Kaifeng (1232) began on 8 April 1232. There were peace talks into the summer of 1232 but negotiations ceased after the Jin murdered the Mongol envoy Tang Qing in his hostel as well as some 30 other people. Bianjing suffered from an epidemic in the summer of 1232 and ran out of emergency food supplies, causing starvation. Despite these setbacks and disorderly conditions within the city, the siege is well recorded due to the eyewitness account of a Han intellectual who recorded these events in his memoirs. As a result, the siege became historically significant for its descriptions of gunpowder weapons.

The Mongols deployed gunpowder weapons along with other more conventional siege techniques such as building stockades, watchtowers, trenches, guardhouses, and forcing Chinese captives to haul supplies and fill moats. The Jin scholar Liu Qi recounts in his memoir, "the attack against the city walls grew increasingly intense, and bombs rained down as [the enemy] advanced." The Jin defenders also deployed gunpowder bombs as well as fire arrows launched using a type of early solid-propellant rocket. Of the bombs, Liu Qi writes, "From within the walls the defenders responded with a gunpowder bomb called the heaven-shaking-thunder bomb (震天雷). Whenever the [Mongol] troops encountered one, several men at a time would be turned into ashes." The History of Jin provides a description of the bomb: "The heaven-shaking-thunder bomb is an iron vessel filled with gunpowder. When lighted with fire and shot off, it goes off like a crash of thunder that can be heard for a hundred li [48 kilometres or 30 miles], burning an expanse of land more than half a mu [所爇圍半畝之上, a mu is 670 square metres or 1/6 acre], and the fire can even penetrate iron armor."

Heaven-shaking-thunder bombs, also known as thunder crash bombs, had been used in 1231 by a Jin general to destroy a Mongol warship. A Jin general named Wanyan Eke had lost the defence of Hezhong to the Mongols and fled on ships with 3,000 of his men. The Mongols pursued them with their ships until the Jin broke through by using thunder crash bombs that caused flashes and flames. However during the siege the Mongols responded by protecting themselves with elaborate screens of thick cowhide. This was effective enough for workers to get right up to the walls to undermine their foundations and excavate protective niches. Jin defenders countered by tying iron cords and attaching them to heaven-shaking-thunder bombs, which were lowered down the walls until they reached the place where the miners worked. The protective leather screens were unable to withstand the explosion, and were penetrated, killing the excavators.

Another weapon the Jin employed was an improved re-usable version of the fire lance called the flying fire lance. The History of Jin provides a detailed description: "To make the lance, use chi-huang paper, sixteen layers of it for the tube, and make it a bit longer than two feet. Stuff it with willow charcoal, iron fragments, magnet ends, sulfur, white arsenic [probably an error that should mean saltpeter], and other ingredients, and put a fuse to the end. Each troop has hanging on him a little iron pot to keep fire [probably hot coals], and when it's time to do battle, the flames shoot out the front of the lance more than ten feet, and when the gunpowder is depleted, the tube isn't destroyed." While Mongol soldiers typically held a view of disdain toward most Jin weapons, apparently they greatly feared the flying fire lance and heaven-shaking-thunder bomb.

Bianjing managed to hold out for a year before Aizong fled in the winter of 1232–33. The city was left under the command of Cui Li, who surrendered on 29 May. In some cases Jin troops still fought with success, scoring isolated victories such as when a Jin commander led 450 fire lancers against a Mongol encampment, which was "completely routed, and three thousand five hundred were drowned." Aizong arrived at Guide (modern Shangqiu) on 26 February 1233 along with his entourage of loyal Jurchen and Han officials. He then moved to Caizhou on 3 August. Aizong's situation was so dire that he sent envoys to the Song asking for food. Caizhou came under siege by the Mongols in December 1233. Aizong tried to escape but failed, after which he abdicated to a distant relative, Wanyan Chenglin (posthumously Emperor Mo of Jin), and killed himself. Even after Aizong committed suicide in 1234, one loyalist gathered all the metal he could find in the city he was defending, even gold and silver, and made explosives to lob against the Mongols, but the momentum of the Mongol Empire could not be stopped. Caizhou fell to the Mongols on 9 February 1234 and the last Jin emperor died in the street fighting.

== Government ==
=== Institutions ===
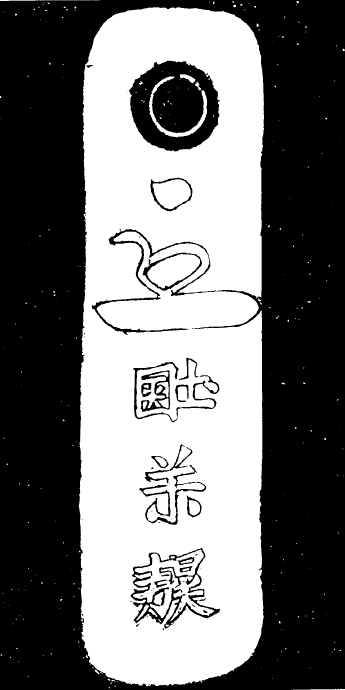
Jurchen paizi

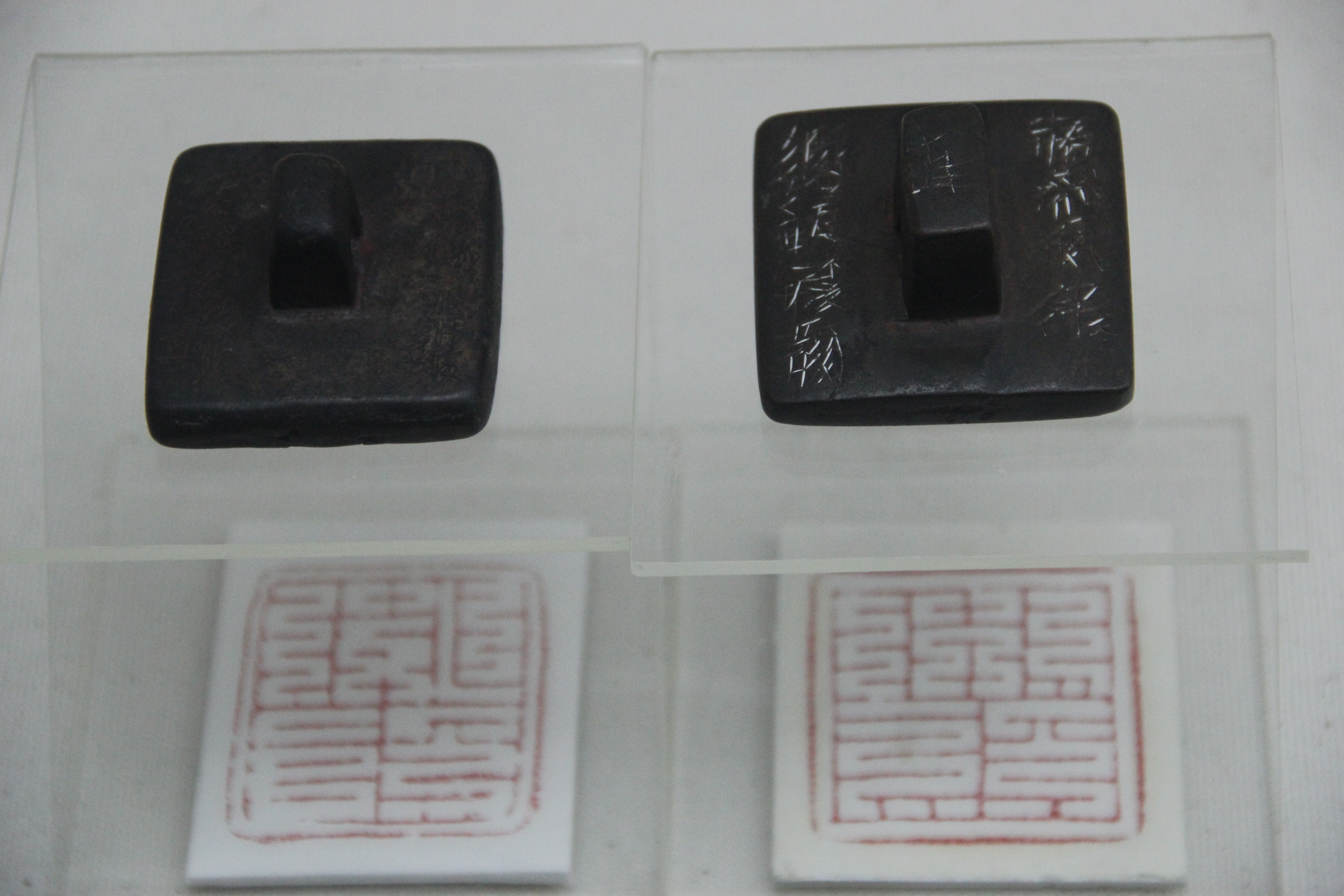
Jin dynasty bronze seals

The government of the Jin dynasty merged Jurchen customs with institutions adopted from the Liao and Song dynasties. The pre-dynastic Jurchen government was based on the quasi-egalitarian tribal council. Jurchen society at the time did not have a strong political hierarchy. The Shuo Fu (說郛) records that the Jurchen tribes were not ruled by central authority and locally elected their chieftains. Tribal customs were retained after Aguda united the Jurchen tribes and formed the Jin dynasty, coexisting alongside more centralised institutions. The Jin dynasty had five capitals, a practice they adopted from the Balhae and the Liao. The Jin had to overcome the difficulties of controlling a multicultural empire composed of territories once ruled by the Liao and Northern Song. The solution of the early Jin government was to establish separate government structures for different ethnic groups.

The Jin court maintained a clear separation between the sedentary population who had lived under Liao rule, and the sedentary population who formerly lived under Northern Song rule but had never been under Liao rule. The former they referred to as hanren or yanren while the latter they referred to as nanren.

=== Imperial exams ===
The imperial examinations were instituted for the Han population in 1123, an imperial university was set up in the capital in 1132, and the National Academy was established in 1151. Only men could attend these educational institutions. Sometimes individuals hired scholars to teach their children, including girls and young women.

Two separate examinations were held to accommodate their former Liao and Song subjects. In the north examinations focused on lyric-meter poetry and rhapsodies while in the south, Confucian Classics were tested. During the reign of Emperor Xizong of Jin (r. 1135–1150), the contents of both examinations were unified and examinees were tested on both genres. Emperor Zhangzong of Jin (r. 1189–1208) abolished the prefectural examinations. Emperor Shizong of Jin (r. 1161–1189) created the first examination conducted in the Jurchen language, with a focus on political writings and poetry. Graduates of the Jurchen examination were called "treatise graduates" (celun jinshi) to distinguish them from the regular Chinese jinshi.

== Culture ==
=== Architecture ===
The Jin dynasty sought to revive of Tang-era urban design through architectural projects in Kaifeng and Zhongdu (modern Beijing), constructing landmarks such as a bell tower and drum tower to announce the night curfew which had been reinstated after being abolished by the Song government. The Jurchens, following the Khitan precedent, lived in tents amid Han Chinese-style architecture, which itself was modeled after Song dynasty Kaifeng.

=== Religion ===
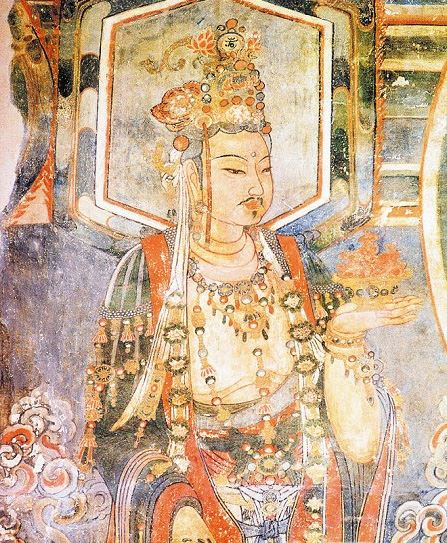
Jin dynasty fresco of a bodhisattva from Chongfu Temple (崇福寺), Shuozhou, Shanxi

Because the Jin had few contacts with its southern neighbour, the Song dynasty, different cultural developments took place in both states. Within Confucianism, the Neo-Confucian "Learning of the Way" that developed and became orthodox in Song did not take root in Jin. Jin scholars put more emphasis on the work of northern Song scholar and poet Su Shi (1037–1101) rather than on Zhu Xi's (1130–1200) scholarship that constituted the foundation of the Learning of the Way.

==== Taoism ====
A significant branch of Taoism called the Quanzhen School was founded under the Jin Dynasty by Han Chinese Wang Zhe (1113–1170), founder of formal congregations in 1167 and 1168. He took the nickname of Wang Chongyang (Wang "Double Yang"), and his disciples were retrospectively known as the "seven patriarchs of Quanzhen". The ci poetry that characterized Jin literature was tightly linked to Quanzhen: two-thirds of the ci poetry written in Jin times was composed by Quanzhen Taoists.

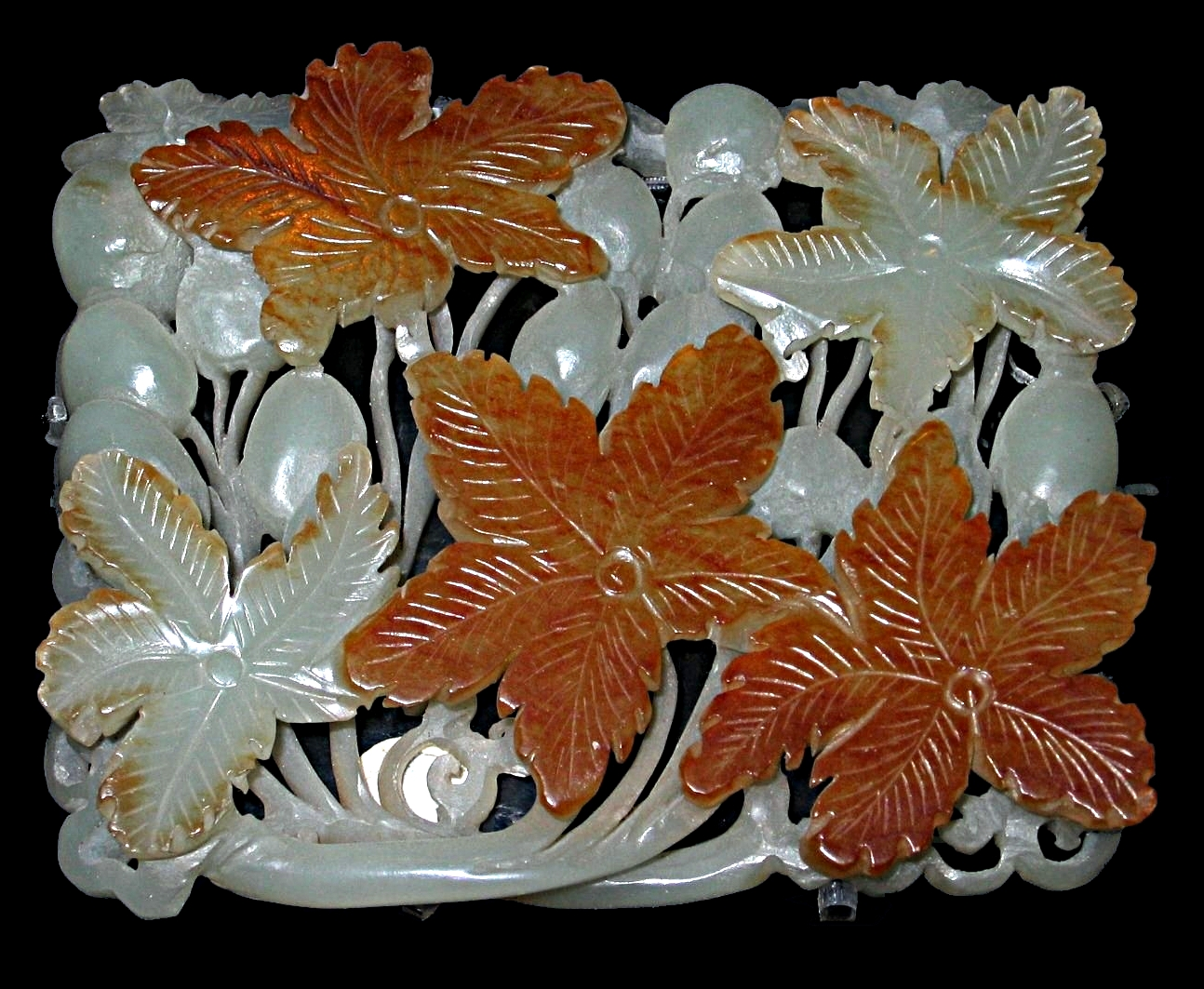
Jade ornament with flower design, Jin dynasty, Shanghai Museum

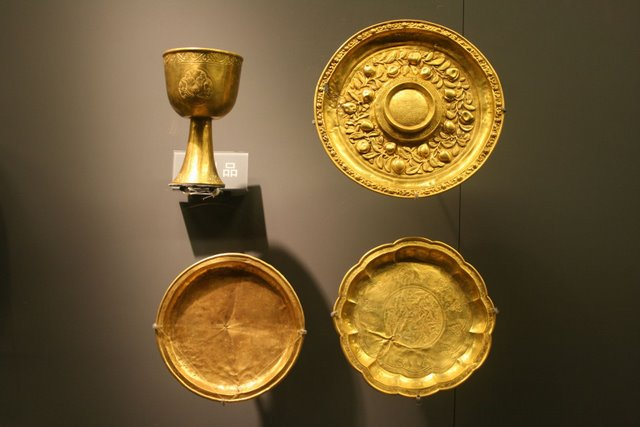
Chinese gold plates and a chalice from the Jin Dynasty's Zhongdu

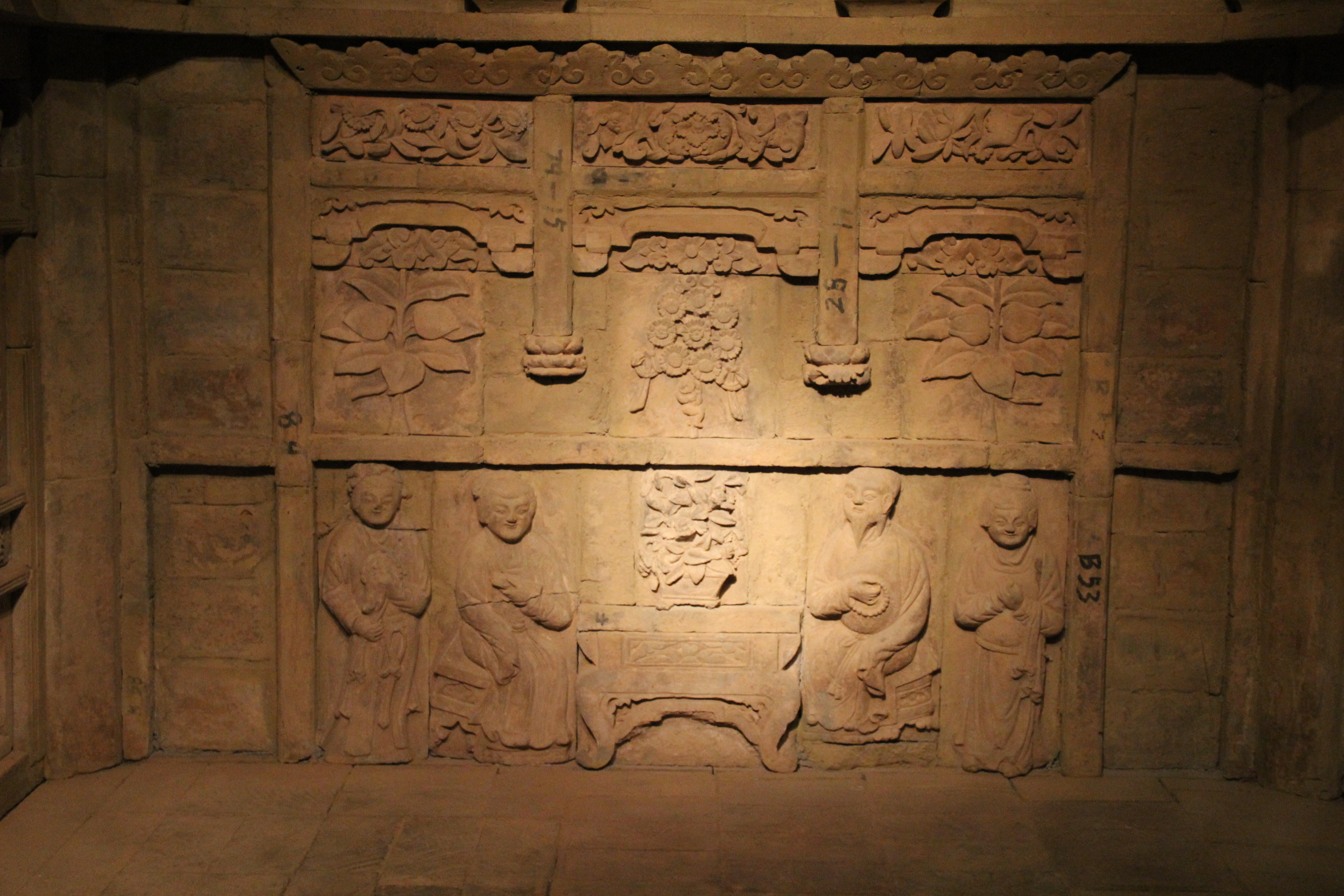
Jin tomb with stage scene

The Jin state sponsored an edition of the Taoist Canon that is known as the Precious Canon of the Mysterious Metropolis of the Great Jin (大金玄都寶藏; Dà Jīn Xuándū Bǎozàng). Based on a smaller version of the Canon printed by Emperor Huizong (r. 1100–1125) of the Song, it was completed in 1192 under the direction and support of Emperor Zhangzong (r. 1190–1208). In 1188, Zhangzong's grandfather and predecessor Shizong (r. 1161–1189) ordered for the Song Canon woodblocks to be transferred from the Jin southern capital Kaifeng (the former Northern Song capital) to the central capital's "Abbey of Celestial Perpetuity" (天長觀; Tiāncháng Guān), on the site of what is now the White Cloud Temple in Beijing. Other Taoist writings were also moved there from another abbey in the central capital. Zhangzong instructed the abbey's superintendent Sun Mingdao (孫明道) and two civil officials to prepare a complete Canon for printing. After sending people on a "nationwide search for scriptures" that yielded 1,074 fascicles of text that had not been included in the Huizong edition of the Canon and also securing donations to fund the new printing, Sun Mingdao proceeded to have the new woodblocks cut in 1192. The final print consisted of 6,455 fascicles. Despite records that the Jin emperors offered copies of the Canon as gifts, no surviving traces of the Canon had been found as of 2008.

==== Buddhism ====
A Buddhist Canon or "Tripitaka" was also produced in Shanxi, the same place where an enhanced version of the Jin-sponsored Taoist Canon would be reprinted in 1244. The project was initiated in 1139 by a Buddhist nun named Cui Fazhen, who swore (and allegedly "broke her arm to seal the oath") that she would raise the necessary funds to make a new official edition of the Canon printed by the Northern Song. Completed in 1173, the Jin Tripitaka counted about 7,000 fascicles, "a major achievement in the history of Buddhist private printing." It was further expanded during the Yuan dynasty.

Buddhism thrived during the Jin period, both in its relation with the imperial court and in society in general. Many sutras were also carved on stone tablets. The donors who funded such inscriptions included members of the Jin imperial family, high officials, common people, and Buddhist priests. Some sutras have only survived from these carvings and thus they are important in the study of Chinese Buddhism. At the same time, the Jin court sold monk certificates for revenue. This practice was initiated in 1162 by Emperor Shizong to fund his wars, and stopped three years later when the wars were over. His successor Zhanzong used the same method to raise military funds in 1197 and again one year later to raise money to fight famine in the Western Capital. The same practice was used again in 1207 (to fight the Song and more famine) as well as under the reigns of emperors Weishao (r. 1209–1213) and Xuanzong (r. 1213–1224) to fight the Mongols.

== List of emperors ==
Sovereigns of the Jin dynasty 1115–1234
| Temple name | Posthumous name^{1} | Jurchen name | Chinese name | Years of reign | Era names and years |
|---|---|---|---|---|---|
| Taizu (太祖) | Wuyuan (武元) | Aguda (阿骨打) | Min (旻) | 1115–1123 | Shouguo (收國; 1115–1116); Tianfu (天輔; 1117–1123) |
| Taizong (太宗) | Wenlie (文烈) | Wuqimai (吳乞買) | Sheng (晟) | 1123–1135 | Tianhui (天會; 1123–1135) |
| Xizong (熙宗) | Xiaocheng (孝成) | Hela (合剌) | Dan (亶) | 1135–1149 | Tianhui (天會; 1135–1138); Tianjuan (天眷; 1138–1141); Huangtong (皇統; 1141–1149) |
| Jingzu (景祖) | Yang (煬) | Digunai (迪古乃) | Liang (亮) | 1149–1161 | Tiande (天德, 1149–1153); Zhenyuan (貞元; 1153–1156); Zhenglong (正隆; 1156–1161) |
| Shizong (世宗) | Renxiao (仁孝) | Wulu (烏祿) | Yong (雍) | 1161–1189 | Dading (大定; 1161–1189) |
| Zhangzong (章宗) | Guangxiao (光孝) | Madage (麻達葛) | Jing (璟) | 1189–1208 | Mingchang (明昌; 1190–1196); Cheng'an (承安; 1196–1200); Taihe (泰和; 1200–1208) |
| None | – | Unknown | Yongji (永濟) | 1208–1213 | Da'an (大安; 1209–1212); Chongqing (崇慶; 1212–1213); Zhining (至寧; 1213) |
| Xuanzong 宣宗 | Shengxiao (聖孝) | Wudubu (吾睹補) | Xun (珣) | 1213–1224 | Zhenyou (貞祐; 1213–1217); Xingding (興定; 1217–1222); Yuanguang (元光; 1222–1224) |
| Aizong (哀宗, official); Zhuangzong (莊宗, unofficial); Minzong (閔宗, unofficial); Yizong (義宗, unofficial) | None | Ningjiasu (寧甲速) | Shouxu (守緒) | 1224–1234 | Zhengda (正大; 1224–1232); Kaixing (開興; 1232); Tianxing (天興; 1232–1234) |
| None | Ai (哀) | Hudun (呼敦) | Chenglin (承麟) | 1234 | Shengchang (盛昌; 1234) |
1: For full posthumous names, see the articles for individual emperors.

=== Family tree ===
Emperors family tree

Wanyan Hanpu 函普; Shizu 始祖
Wanyan Wulu 烏魯; Dedi 德皇帝
Wanyan Bahai 完顏跋海; Andi 安皇帝
Wanyan Suike 綏可; Xianzu 獻祖
Wanyan Shilu 完顏石魯; Zhaozu 昭祖
Wanyan Wugunai 完顏烏骨迺; Jingzu 景祖; ~1050–1021–1074
Wanyan Helibo 完顏劾里鉢; Shizu 世祖; 1039–1074–1092 | Wanyan Polashu 完顏頗刺淑; Suzong 肅宗; 1042–1092–1094 | Wanyan Yingge 完顏盈歌; Muzong 穆宗; 1053–1094–1103 | Wanyan Hezhe 完顏劾者 d.1121
Wanyan Wuyashu 完顏烏雅束; Kangzong 康宗; 1061–1103–1113 | Wanyan Aguda 完顏阿骨打; Taizu 太祖; 1068-(born 1113)1115–1123 | Wanyan Wuqimai 完顏吳乞買; Taizong 太宗; 1075–1123–1135 | □ | Wanyan Sagai 完顏撒改
Wanyan Zongjun 完顏宗峻 d.1124 Huizong 徽宗 | Wanyan Zonggan 完顏宗乾 d.1141 Dezong 德宗 | Wanyan Zongfu 完顏宗輔 1096–1135; Ruizong 睿宗 | Wanyan Nianhan 完顏粘罕; 1080–1136
Wanyan Hela 完顏合剌; Xizong 熙宗; 1119–1135–1149 | Wanyan Liang 完顏亮; Prince of Hailing 海陵王; 1122–1149–1161 | Wanyan Yong 完顏雍; Shizong 世宗; 1123–1161–1189
Wanyan Yungong 完顏允恭; 1146–1185; Xianzong 顯宗 | Wanyan Yongji 完顏永濟; Prince Shao of Wei 衛紹王; 1168–1209–1213
Wanyan Jing 完顏璟; Zhangzong 章宗; 1168–1190–1208 | Wanyan Xun 完顏珣; Xuanzong 宣宗; 1163–1213–1223
Wanyan Shouxu 完顏守緒 1234; Aizong 哀宗; 1198–1224–1234
Wanyan Chenglin 完顏承麟; Mo 末帝 r.1234; d.1234

== See also ==
- Eastern Xia
- Jurchen Jin emperors family tree
- Korean–Jurchen border conflicts
- Timeline of the Jin–Song Wars

== Notes ==
| Preceded by Liao dynasty | Dynasties in Chinese history 1115–1234 | Succeeded by Yuan dynasty |
