= List of emperors of the Liao dynasty =

== Emperors table ==
There were nine emperors of the Liao dynasty. The Liao dynasty was a Khitan-led dynasty of China that at its height ruled over what is now Shanxi, Hebei, Liaoning, Jilin, Heilongjiang, and Inner Mongolia provinces in China, as well as portions of the Korean peninsula, portions of the Russian Far East, and much of the Mongolian Plateau.

For emperors of the Northern Liao and Qara Khitai (Western Liao), see Northern Liao#Monarchs and Qara Khitai#Sovereigns of Qara Khitai.

Liao dynasty 916-1125
Temple Names (Miao Hao 廟號 miàohào)	Posthumous Names (Shi Hao 諡號 shìhào)	Birth Names	Period of Reigns	Era Names (Nian Hao 年號 niánhào) and their according range of years
Convention: "Liao" + temple name except Liao Tianzuodi who is referred using "Liao" + posthumous name
Taizu (太祖 Tàizǔ)	Shen Tian Huangdi	Yelü Abaoji (耶律阿保機 Yēlǜ Ābǎojī)	916–926	Shence (神冊 Shéncè) 916-922; Tianzan (天贊 Tiānzàn) 922-926
Taizong (太宗 Tàizōng)	Xiao Wu Huangdi	Yelü Deguang (耶律德光 Yēlǜ Déguāng)	926–947	Tianxian (天顯 Tiānxiǎn) 926-937; Huitong (會同 Huìtóng) 937-947; Datong (大同 Dàtóng) 947
Shizong (世宗 Shìzōng)	Tian Shou Huangdi	Yelü Ruan (耶律阮 Yēlǜ Ruǎn)	947–951	Tianlu (天祿 Tiānlù) 947-951
Muzong (穆宗 Mùzōng)		Yelü Jing (耶律璟 Yēlǜ Jǐng)	951–969	Yingli (應曆 Yìnglì) 951-969
Jingzong (景宗 Jǐngzōng)		Yelü Xian (耶律賢 Yēlǜ Xián)	969–982	Baoning (保寧 Bǎoníng) 969-979; Qianheng (乾亨 Qiánhēng) 979-982
Shengzong (聖宗 Shèngzōng)	Wen Wu Da Xiao Xuan Huangdi	Yelü Longxu (耶律隆緒 Yēlǜ Lóngxù)	982–1031	Qianheng (乾亨 Qiánhēng) 982; Tonghe (統和 Tǒnghé) 983-1012; Kaitai (開泰 Kāitài) 1012-1021; Taiping (太平 Tàipíng) 1021-1031
Xingzong (興宗 Xīngzōng)	Xiao Zheng Huangdi	Yelü Zongzhen (耶律宗真 Yēlǜ Zōngzhēn)	1031–1055	Jingfu (景福 Jǐngfú) 1031-1032; Chongxi (重熙 Chóngxī) 1032-1055
Daozong (道宗 Dàozōng)		Yelü Hongji (耶律洪基 Yēlǜ Hóngjī)	1055–1101	Qingning (清寧 Qīngníng) 1055-1064; Xianyong (咸雍 Xiányōng) 1065-1074; Taikang (太康 Tàikāng) or Dakang (大康 Dàkāng) 1075-1084; Da'an (大安 Dà'ān) 1085-1094; Shouchang (壽昌 Shòuchāng) or Shoulong (壽隆 Shòulóng) 1095-1101
	Tianzuodi (天祚帝 Tiānzuòdì)	Yelü Yanxi (耶律延禧 Yēlǜ Yánxǐ)	1101–1125	Qiantong (乾統 Qiántǒng) 1101-1110; Tianqing (天慶 Tiānqìng) 1111-1120; Baoda (保大 Bǎodà) 1121-1125

== Emperors family tree ==
Yelü clan - Liao dynasty

- - Liao dynasty emperors
- - Dongdan Kingdom rulers
- - Northern Liao rulers
- - Qara Khitai rulers

Yelü Nieli 耶律涅里
Yelü Pidie 耶律毗牒
Yelü Keling 耶律頦領
Yelü Noulisi 耶律耨里思; Suzu 肅祖
Yelü Salade 耶律薩剌德; Yizu 辽懿祖
Yelü Yundeshi 耶律勻德實; Xuanzu 辽玄祖
Yelü Saladi 耶律撤剌的; Dezu 辽德祖
Yelü Abaoji 耶律阿保機; Taizu 太祖; 872–907–926	Yelü Anduan 耶律安端 ?-947-952
Yelü Bei 耶律倍; Yizong 辽义宗; 899-926- 930-937	Queen Xiao of Dongdan Kingdom 人皇王妃萧氏 ?-930-940	Yelü Deguang 耶律德光; Taizong 太宗; 902–926–947	Yelü Lihu 耶律李胡; 911-960; Zhangsudi 辽章肃帝	□
Yelü Ruan 耶律阮; Shizong 世宗; 918–947–951	Yelü Jing 耶律璟; Muzong 穆宗; 931–951–969	□
Yelü Xian 耶律賢; Jingzong 景宗; 948–969–982	□
Yelü Longxu 耶律隆緒; Shengzong 聖宗; 971–982–1031	□
Yelü Zongzhen 耶律宗真; Xingzong 興宗; 1015–1031–1055	Liáo sì Yuándì 辽嗣元帝
Yelü Hongji 耶律洪基; Daozong 道宗; 1032–1055–1101	Yelü Hélǔwò 耶律和魯斡 仁圣皇太叔 ?-1110	□	□
Yelü Jun 耶律浚; 1057–1077; Shunzong 顺宗	Yelü Chun 耶律淳; Xuanzong 宣宗; 1062-1122	Empress Dowager; Xiao Puxiannü 蕭普賢女 ?-1122	Yelü Zhulie 耶律朮烈; Yingzong 英宗 ?-1123	Yelü Dashi 耶律大石; Dezong 德宗; 1087-1124-1143	Xiao Tabuyan 蕭塔不煙; Empress Gantian 感天皇后 ?-1143-1150
Yelü Yangxi 耶律延禧; 1075–1128; Tianzuodi 天祚帝; 1101–1125	Yelü Yilie 耶律夷列; Renzong 仁宗 ?-1150-1163	Yelü Pusuwan 耶律普速完; Empress Dowager; Chengtian 承天太后 ?-1163-1178
Yelü Yali 耶律雅里; 1094-1123	Yelü Zhilugu 耶律直魯古; Mozhu 末主 / Modi 末帝 ?-1178-1211-1213
Princess Húnhū 渾忽公主	Kuchlug 屈出律; Usurper of Qara Khitai ?-1211-1218

== Timeline ==
Legend:

- Orange denotes Liao monarchs
- Teal denotes Northern Liao monarchs
- Pink denotes Western Liao monarchs
