= Juerbiesu =

Juerbiesu 菊兒別速

Empress dowager of the Western Liao dynasty
- Tenure: 1177–1213
- Predecessor: Yelü Pusuwan
- Spouse: Yelü Zhilugu; Inanch Bilge khan Genghis Khan
- Issue: Princess Hunhu

Ju'erbiesu (Chinese: 菊兒別速; pinyin: Jú'erbiésù) was an empress of the Western Liao dynasty (Qara Khitai), Mongol Empire, and Naiman. She was with Yelü Zhilugu during his capture by Kuchlug in 1211. She was later honored as empress dowager by Kuchlug.
