= Yelü =

Clan of Khitan origin founded in 907

- The name of Yelü in Khitan small scripts
- Country: Liao dynasty, Northern Liao, Western Liao, Eastern Liao, Later Liao
- Founded: 907 (Abaoji assumed title of khagan)
- Founder: Yelü Abaoji
- Final ruler: Yelü Zhilugu
- Titles: Emperor of the Great Liao
- Estates: Palaces in Linhuang and Balasagun
- Deposition: 1211 (usurpation of Western Liao throne by Kuchlug)

The Yelü clan (Khitan:, spelled əy.er.uu.əld, pronounced Yeruuld; Chinese: 耶律; pinyin: Yēlǜ), alternatively rendered as Yila (Chinese: 移剌; pinyin: Yílǎ) or Yarud, was a prominent family of ethnic Khitan origin in the history of China. The clan assumed leadership of the Khitan tribal confederation in 907 when Abaoji was made khagan. In 916, Abaoji founded the Liao dynasty. After the fall of the Liao dynasty in 1125, members of the Yelü family continued to play significant roles in history, most notably for ruling the Western Liao and during the Mongols era of conquest in the 13th century. Yelü Chucai, the last recorded person to be able to speak and read the Khitan language, is notable for advising Genghis Khan in the Confucian tradition.

The Yelü clan established numerous dynastic regimes in Chinese history: the Liao dynasty, Northern Liao, Western Liao, Eastern Liao, and Later Liao. In particular, the Liao dynasty and Western Liao were powerful empires that had significant impact on regional history.

== Rise to power ==
Abaoji, born in 872, was the son of the chieftain of the Yila tribe. At this time, the Yaolian clan had led the Khitan people since the mid-eighth century, and were the only Khitan family to have adopted a surname at this point as this was seen as a mark of Han culture and not befitting of peoples of the steppe.

In 901, Abaoji was elected chieftain of the Yila tribe and in 905 forged relations with Li Keyong of the Shatuo Turks. In 907, he was chosen leader of the Khitans, the first outside the Yaolian lineage to be chosen in more than a century and a half. From this, Abaoji and his successors developed the Liao dynasty, which would conquer all of Manchuria, the northern fringe of the Central Plain known as the Sixteen Prefectures and adjacent areas of northern Korea, eastern Mongolian Plateau and parts of far-eastern Siberia.

== Liao dynasty ==
Every monarch of the Liao dynasty was from the Yelü clan, which adopted the surname sometime in the 930s, after the death of Abaoji (Emperor Taizu). The clan directly governed the southern half of the empire while the Xiao consort clan governed the north. The Southern Chancellory was charged with governing the sedentary population of the empire, mostly ethnic Han and residents of the conquered kingdom of Bohai. As such, there is evidence of at least limited Sinicization on the part of the Yelü clan.

Even as late as 1074, a proposal was brought before the Liao emperors to adopt surnames throughout the empire. This was rejected as an idea that would disrupt the traditional Khitan social order.

The Liao dynasty fell to the Jurchen-led Jin dynasty in 1125, but a branch of the Yelü imperial clan survived and established another dynastic empire in the Western Regions known as the Western Liao, also called the Qara Khitai.

== Yelü leaders ==
=== Liao dynasty ===
Emperors of the Liao dynasty (916-1125)
Temple Names ( Miao Hao 廟號 miàohào)	Posthumous Names ( Shi Hao 諡號 shìhào)	Birth Names	Period of Reigns	Era Names (Nian Hao 年號 niánhào) and their according range of years
Convention: "Liao" + temple name except Liao Tianzuodi who is referred using "Liao" + regnal name
		Nieli (涅里 Nièlǐ)		
		Pidie (毗牒 Pídié)		
		Keling (頦領 Kélǐng)		
Suzu (Posthumously honored) (肅祖 Sùzŭ)	昭烈皇帝	Noulisi (耨里思 Nòulǐsī)		
Yizu (Posthumously honored) (懿祖 Yìzŭ)	莊敬皇帝	Salade (薩剌德 Sàládé)		
Xuanzu (Posthumously honored) (玄祖 Xuánzŭ)	簡獻皇帝	Yundeshi (勻德實 Yúndéshí)		
Dezu (Posthumously honored) (德祖 Dézŭ)	宣簡皇帝	Saladi (撒剌的 Sālàdī)		
Taizu (太祖 Tàizǔ)	升天皇帝, 大聖大明天皇帝, 大聖大明神烈天皇帝	Yi (億 Yì)	916-926	Shence (神冊 Shéncè) 916-922 Tianzan (天贊 Tiānzàn) 922-926; Tianxian (天顯 Tiānxiǎn) 926
Yizong (義宗 Yìzōng)	文武元皇王, 讓國皇帝, 文獻皇帝, 文獻欽義皇帝	Bei (倍 Bèi)		
Taizong (太宗 Tàizōng)	嗣聖皇帝, 孝武皇帝, 孝武惠文皇帝	Deguang (德光 Déguāng)	926-947	Tianxian (天顯 Tiānxiǎn) 927-938 Huitong (會同 Huìtóng) 938-947; Datong (大同 Dàtóng) 947
Shizong (世宗 Shìzōng)	孝和皇帝, 孝和莊憲皇帝	Ruan (阮 Ruǎn)	947-951	Tianlu (天祿 Tiānlù) 947-951
Muzong (穆宗 Mùzōng)	天順皇帝, 孝安敬正皇帝	Jing (璟 Jǐng)	951-969	Yingli (應曆 Yìnglì) 951-969
Jingzong (景宗 Jǐngzōng)	孝成皇帝, 孝成康靖皇帝	Xian (賢 Xián)	969-982	Baoning (保寧 Bǎoníng) 969-979 Qianheng (乾亨 Qiánhēng) 979-982
Shengzong (聖宗 Shèngzōng)	文武大孝宣皇帝	Longxu (隆緒 Lóngxù)	982-1031	Qianheng (乾亨 Qiánhēng) 982 Tonghe (統和 Tǒnghé) 983-1012; Kaitai (開泰 Kāitài) 1012-1021; Taiping (太平 Tàipíng) 1021-1031
Xingzong (興宗 Xīngzōng)	神聖孝章皇帝	Zongzhen (宗眞 Zōngzhēn)	1031-1055	Jingfu (景福 Jǐngfú) 1031-1032 Chongxi (重熙 Chóngxī) 1032-1055
Daozong (道宗 Dàozōng)	仁聖大孝文皇帝	Hongji (洪基 Hóngjī)	1055-1101	Qingning (清寧 Qīngníng) 1055-1064 Xianyong (咸雍 Xiányōng) 1065-1074; Taikang (太康 Tàikāng) or Dakang (大康 Dàkāng) 1075-1084; Da'an (大安 Dà'ān) 1085-1094; Shouchang (壽昌 Shòuchāng) or Shoulong (壽隆 Shòulóng) 1095-1101
Shunzong (順宗 Shùnzōng)	昭懷太子, 大孝順聖皇帝	Jun (濬 Jùn)		
Gongzong (恭宗 Gōngzōng)	Tianzuodi (天祚帝 Tiānzuòdì) ^{1}	Yanxi (延禧 Yánxǐ)	1101-1125	Qiantong (乾統 Qiántǒng) 1101-1110 Tianqing (天慶 Tiānqìng) 1111-1120; Baoda (保大 Bǎodà) 1121-1125
^{1} Regnal name. Not a posthumous name.

=== Western Liao dynasty ===
Emperors of the Western Liao dynasty (1124-1218)
Temple Names ( Miao Hao 廟號 miàohào)	Posthumous Names ( Shi Hao 諡號 shìhào)	Birth Names	Convention	Period of Reign	Era Names (Nian Hao 年號 niánhào) and their according range of years
Convention: check each sovereign
Dezong (德宗 Dézōng)	Tianyouwuliedi (天祐武烈帝 Tiānyòuwǔlièdì)	Yelü Dashi (耶律大石 Yēlǜ Dàshí or 耶律達實 Yēlǜ Dáshí) ^{1}	use birth name	1124-1144	Yanqing (延慶 Yánqìng) 1124 or 1125-1134 Kangguo (康國 Kāngguó) 1134-1144
Did not apply	Gantianhou (感天后 Gǎntiānhòu)	Tabuyan (塔不煙 Tǎbùyān)	"Xi Liao" + posthumous name	1144-1150	Xianqing (咸清 Xiánqīng) 1144-1150
Renzong (仁宗 Rénzōng)	正徳皇帝	Yelü Yilie (耶律夷列 Yēlǜ Yíliè)	"Xi Liao" + temple name	1150-1164	Shaoxing (紹興 Shàoxīng) 1150-1164
Did not apply	Chengtianhou (承天后 Chéngtiānhòu)	Pusuwan (普速完 Pǔsùwán)	"Xi Liao" + posthumous name	1164-1178	Chongfu (崇福 Chóngfú) 1164-1178
None	None	Yelü Zhilugu (耶律直魯古 Yēlǜ Zhílǔgǔ)	use birth name	1178-1211	Tianxi (天禧 Tiānxī) 1178-1211
None	None	Kuchlug (Ch. 屈出律 Qūchūlǜ) ^{2}	use birth name	1211-1218	Tianxi (天禧 Tiānxī) 1211-1218
^{1} "Dashi" might be the Chinese title "Taishi", meaning "vizier"; or it could mean "stone" in Turkish, as the Chinese transliteration suggests.^{2} Kuchlug was not a member of the Yelü clan by birth, but he later became the son-in-law of Yelü Zhilugu and usurped the Western Liao throne.

== See also ==
- Khitan people
- Liao dynasty
- Northern Liao
- Western Liao
- Eastern Liao
- Later Liao

— Royal house — House of Yaryul
Preceded by New title	Ruling House of Mongolia; 8th century–1125	Succeeded by Khamag Mongol (Borjigin)
Preceded by Tang dynasty (Li)	Ruling House of (North) China; 916 –1125	Succeeded by Jin dynasty (Wanyan)
Preceded by Kara-Khanid Khanate	Ruling House of Central Asia; 1134 –1220	Succeeded by Mongol Empire (Borjigin)
