= Empress Dowager Chengtian =

Empress Dowager Chengtian (Chinese: 承天太后) may refer to:

- Xiao Yanyan (953–1009), empress and regent of the Liao dynasty
- Yelü Pusuwan (died 1177), regent of Qara Khitai (Western Liao)
