= Baoda =

Baoda was a Chinese era name used by several emperors of China. It may refer to:

- Baoda (寶大, 924–925), an era name used by Qian Liu, king of Wuyue
- Baoda (保大, 943–957), an era name used by Li Jing (Southern Tang)
- Baoda (保大, 1121–1125), an era name used by Emperor Tianzuo of Liao
