= Dezong =

Dezong may refer to:

== Temple name ==
- Emperor Dezong of Tang (742–805)
- Yelü Dashi (died 1143), emperor of Kara Khitai (Western Liao)
- Guangxu Emperor (1871–1908) of the Qing dynasty

== Given name ==
- Emperor An of Jin (397–419), personal name Sima Dezong
