= Yelü Yilie =

Emperor Renzong of Western Liao 西遼仁宗

Emperor of the Western Liao dynasty
- Reign: 1150–1163
- Predecessor: Xiao Tabuyan (as regent)
- Successor: Yelü Pusuwan (as regent)
- Born: 1134
- Died: 1163 (aged 28–29)
- Issue: Yelü Zhilugu
Era name and dates
- Xùxīng (續興): 1150–1163
Temple name
- Rénzōng (仁宗)
- House: Yelü
- Dynasty: Western Liao
- Father: Yelü Dashi
- Mother: Xiao Tabuyan
- Religion: Buddhism

Yelü Yilie (Chinese: 耶律夷列, d. 1163), otherwise known by his temple name Emperor Renzong of Western Liao (Chinese: 西遼仁宗), was the second emperor of the Western Liao dynasty (Qara Khitai), ruling from 1150 to 1163.

== Reign ==
He was too young to succeed as emperor when Yelü Dashi died in 1143. Not much is known about his reign.

History of Liao states he changed his era name to Shaoxing in 1151, however recent coins unearthed in Central Asia might prove it was a scribal mistake. During his reign, there was a census conducted, which turned out 84,500 households in the empire. Although it may also be the number of adult men who could serve in the army.

In 1156, he tried to establish peace with the Jin dynasty unsuccessfully. The same year Karluks under Ayyar Beg revolted against Western Karakhanid ruler Ibrahim III and killed him. Yelü Yilied appointed Ali b. Hasan as Chaghrï Khan to Samarqand. Chagri marched on Ayyar Beg with reinforcements from Qara Khitai and eastern Karakhanid Ibrahim II (who was created Ilig Türkmen by Yelü Dashi). Ibrahim's forces killed Ayyar Beg and Chaghri Khan was reinstated on his throne.

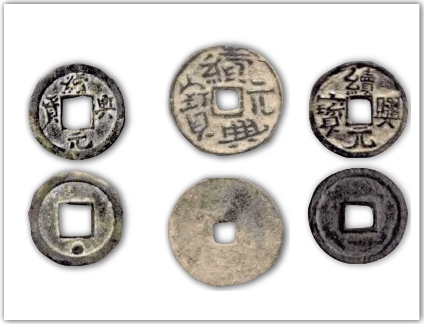
Xuxing coins founded in Balasagun

In 1158, Yelü Yilie ordered expulsion of Karluks from Bukhara and Samarqand to Kashgar and charged Chaghri to deal with matter. Purged Karluks went to Khwarazmshah Il-Arslan to ask for help. Chaghri just had reinforcements from new East Karakhanid ruler Muhammed II consisting of 10,000 men, while Karluks marched on Bukhara with Khwarazmi help. The same year, Chaghri died and was replaced by Masud II, who appeared before Bukhara and defeated Karluks.

That same year, Yelü Yilie died. Since his son Yelü Zhilugu was too young to rule, Yelü Yilie‘s younger sister Yelü Pusuwan was appointed regent.

Yelü Yilie House of Yelü (1150–1163) Born: 1134 Died: 1163
Regnal titles
Preceded by Empress Gantian	Emperor of the Liao Dynasty; 1150–1163	Succeeded by Empress Dowager Chengtian as Regent of Emperor of the Liao Dynasty
Preceded by Empress Gantian	Gurkhan of Qara Khitai; 1150–1163	Succeeded by Empress Dowager Chengtian
