= Alliance Conducted at Sea =

Song–Jin alliance

The Alliance Conducted at Sea (Chinese: 海上之盟; pinyin: Hǎishàng Zhī Méng) was a political alliance in Chinese history between the Han-led Northern Song dynasty and Jurchen-led Jin dynasty in the early 12th century against the Khitan-led Liao dynasty. The alliance was negotiated from 1115 to 1123 by envoys who crossed the Bohai Sea. Under the alliance, the two nations agreed to jointly invade Liao and split captured territories, forswore making unilateral peace with Liao, and Jin agreed to cede the Sixteen Prefectures to Song. Between 1121 and 1123, Song faltered in their military campaigns, while Jin succeeded in driving remnants of the Liao imperial court to Central Asia where they formed the Western Liao dynasty. Jin handed over several of the Sixteen Prefectures to Song including modern-day Beijing. However, in 1125, the alliance ended when Jin, sensing Song's weakness, invaded southward and eventually captured the Song capital of Bianjing (present-day Kaifeng, Henan) in 1127.

== Background ==
In 1005, Song and Liao entered into the Chanyuan Treaty, through which Song officially conceded the loss of the Sixteen Prefectures. Decades of peaceful relations followed. Song broke the Chanyuan Treaty following the Alliance Conducted at Sea.

The term of the Alliance Conducted at Sea were that Song and Jin agreed to jointly invade Liao. If successful, Song would transfer its annual payments from Liao to Jin and Jin would transfer the Sixteen Prefectures to Song.

== Implementation ==
The invasion succeeded, and in 1125 Jin captured the fleeing Emperor Tianzuo of Liao.

Through these joint efforts, Jin became aware of Song's military weakness and as a result transferred only part of the promised Sixteen Prefectures.

== Aftermath ==
In 1127, Jin captured the Song ruler, Emperor Qinzong, his father and predecessor Emperor Huizong, and sacked the Song capital. This event, known as the Jingkang Incident, marked the end of the Northern Song dynasty. The remaining Song imperial family fled and established the Southern Song dynasty.

== See also ==
- History of the Song dynasty
- Jin–Song wars
- Treaty of Shaoxing
- Timeline of the Jin–Song wars
- History of Beijing

== Bibliography ==
- Mote, Frederick W. (1999). Imperial China: 900–1800. Harvard University Press. ISBN 0-674-44515-5. (hardcover); ISBN 978-0-674-01212-7 (paperback).
