= Northern Liao =

Dynastic regime of China (1122-1123)

Great Liao 大遼
- 1122–1123
- Capital: Xijin Fu
- Religion: Tengrism, Buddhism, Taoism, Confucianism, Chinese folk religion
- Government: Monarchy
- Emperor
  - 1122: Yelü Chun
  - 1122–1123: Yelü Ding
- History
  - Yelü Chun enthroned as emperor: 1122
  - Capture of Yelü Ding by Jin dynasty: 1123
- Currency: Chinese cash, Chinese coin, copper coins etc.
Preceded by	Succeeded by
Liao dynasty	Jin dynasty
- Today part of: China

The Northern Liao (simplified Chinese: 北辽; traditional Chinese: 北遼; pinyin: Běi Liáo), officially the Great Liao (simplified Chinese: 大辽; traditional Chinese: 大遼; pinyin: Dà Liáo), was a dynastic regime of China, distinct from the Liao dynasty, established by the Khitan Yelü clan in northern China. The state only existed for a short period of time between 1122 and 1123.

== History ==
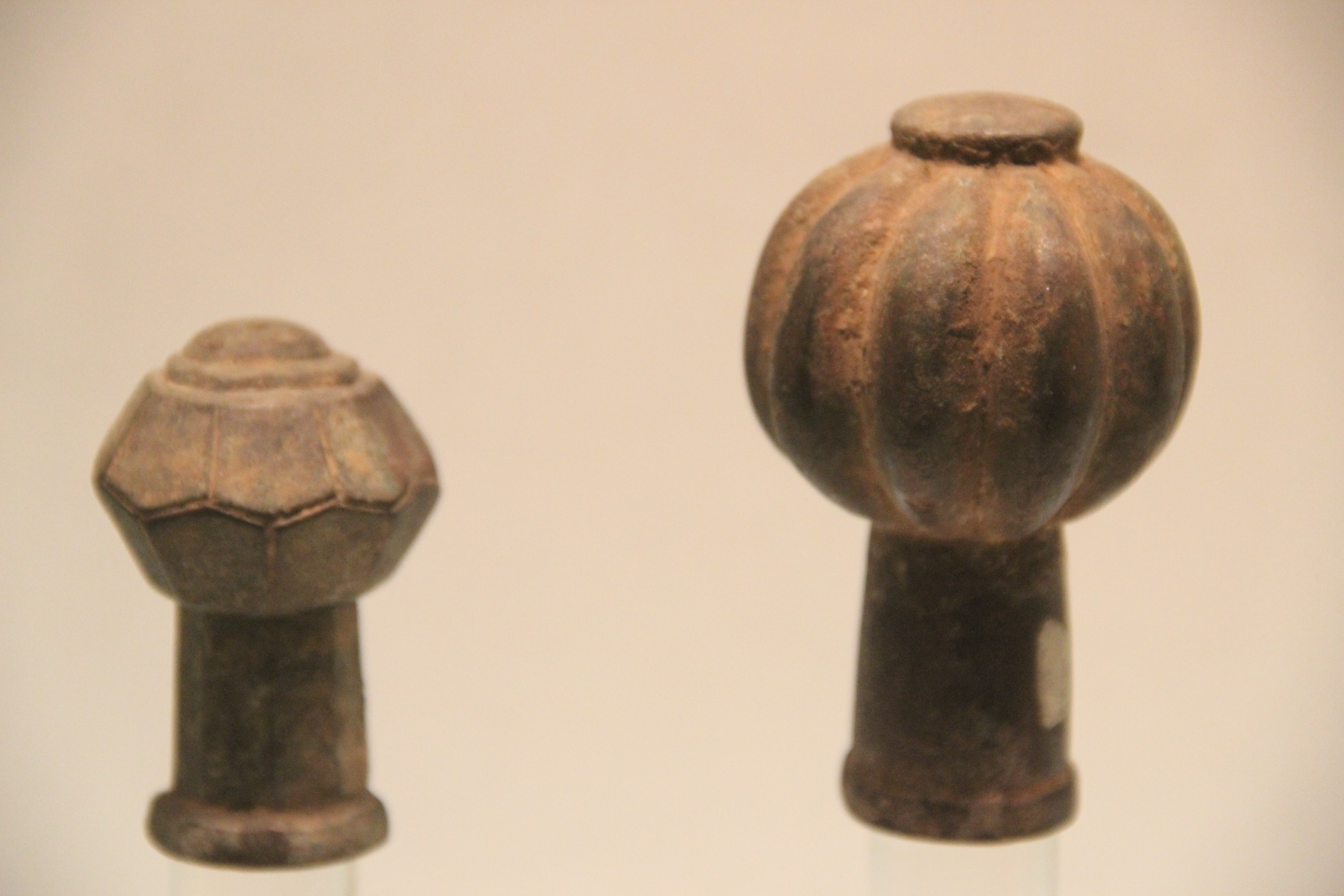
Khitan maces

During the reign of Emperor Tianzuo of Liao, the Jurchen chieftain Wanyan Aguda rebelled against the rule of the Liao dynasty. In 1115, the Jin dynasty was officially proclaimed with Wanyan Aguda as its first emperor. In 1122, Emperor Tianzuo fled to Jiashan (north of modern-day Tumed Left Banner, Inner Mongolia) under the military pressure from the Jin dynasty. Subsequently, Yelü Chun was enthroned as "Emperor Tianxi" (Chinese: 天錫皇帝) by Yelü Dashi and Huilibao. The Emperor Tianzuo, on the other hand, was demoted to a prince and given the title "Prince of Xiangyin" by the Northern Liao court. As the Liao dynasty ruled by Emperor Tianzuo still existed, the regime headed by Emperor Tianxi is known in retrospect as "Northern Liao" (Chinese: 北遼).

After the death of Emperor Tianxi, he was succeeded nominally by Yelü Ding, the Prince of Qin. However, as Yelü Ding was in exile with the Emperor Tianzuo, the Empress Dowager Xiao Puxian'nü was made regent. During the regency of Empress Dowager Xiao, her request for the Jin dynasty to recognize Yelü Ding as emperor was denied. As the Jin forces advanced towards the Northern Liao capital, the Empress Dowager Xiao and Yelü Dashi sought refuge at Emperor Tianzuo's exiled court. The Empress Dowager Xiao was executed for rebelling against the Emperor Tianzuo, but Yelü Dashi was spared.

In 1123, Nanjing surrendered to the Jin forces. When the Jin army attacked the Emperor Tianzuo's refuge in Qingzhong (south of modern-day Hohhot, Inner Mongolia), he decided to escape to the Western Xia dynasty. Yelü Yali, the Prince of Liang, fled north and proclaimed himself emperor, only to die five months later. His son, Yelü Zhulie, succeeded him, but was killed one month later by his own troops. The death of Yelü Zhulie in 1123 marked the end of Northern Liao. In 1124, Yelü Dashi would lead a faction of the Liao court to Central Asia where he proclaimed the Western Liao dynasty. The Liao dynasty led by Emperor Tianzuo would collapse in 1125 when he was captured by the Jin general Wanyan Loushi.

== Monarchs ==
Personal name	Temple name	Posthumous name	Regnal name	Era name	Reign	Reference
Yelü Chun (耶律淳)	Xuanzong (宣宗)	Emperor Xiaozhang (孝章皇帝)	Emperor Tianxi (天錫皇帝)	Jianfu (建福)	1122	
Yelü Ding (耶律定)^{1} Xiao Puxiannü (蕭普賢女)^{2}				Dexing (德興)	1122–1123	
^{1} Enthroned nominally^{2} Regent

== See also ==
- Liao dynasty
- Western Liao
- Eastern Liao
- Later Liao

Preceded by Liao dynasty	Dynasties in Chinese history 1122–1123	Succeeded by Jin dynasty (See also Western Liao)
