= Xiao Tabuyan =

Xiao Tabuyan 蕭塔不煙

Regent of the Western Liao dynasty
- Regency: 1143–1150
- Predecessor: Yelü Dashi (as emperor)
- Successor: Yelü Yilie (as emperor)
- Spouse: Yelü Dashi
- Issue: Yelü Yilie; Yelü Pusuwan
Era name and dates
- Xiánqīng (咸清): 1144–1150
Regnal name
- Empress Gǎntiān (感天皇后)
- House: Xiao
- Dynasty: Western Liao
- Religion: Buddhism

Xiao Tabuyan (Chinese: 蕭塔不煙; pinyin: Xiāo Tǎbùyān, died after 1150) was empress of the Western Liao dynasty (Qara Khitai) by marriage to her cousin Yelü Dashi (Emperor Dezong). She was known in Muslim sources as Kuyang or Orghina. She served as the regent of the empire for her son, Yelü Yilie (Emperor Renzong), during his minority from 1143 to 1150.

== Life ==
After Yelü Dashi's death in 1143, she assumed the throne as regent for their little son Yelü Yilie. She also changed era date to Xianqing and started to rule effectively.

In March 1144, Oghuz tribes reinvaded Bukhara and held it probably until 1148. Later that year, Emperor Xizong of Jin sent a messenger named Zhangge Hannu (粘割韓奴) to Tabuyan, who only arrived in Qara Khitai lands in 1146, demanding her submission to Jin. Furious, Tabuyan executed him immediately.

She stepped down in 1150, when Yelü Yilie came of age.

== Family ==
Spouse: Yelü Dashi (cousin)

Children:

- Yelü Yilie (son)
- Yelü Pusuwan (daughter)

Xiao Tabuyan House of Yelü (1124–1143) Born: ? Died: ?
Regnal titles
Preceded by Emperor Tianyou	Regent of the Liao Dynasty; 1143–1150	Succeeded by Emperor Renzong
Preceded by Emperor Tianyou	Gurkhan of Qara Khitai; 1143–1150	Succeeded by Emperor Renzong
