= Emperor Daozong of Liao =

Emperor of the Liao Dynasty from 1055 to 1101

Emperor Daozong of Liao 遼道宗

Emperor of the Liao dynasty
- Reign: 28 August 1055 – 12 February 1101
- Predecessor: Emperor Xingzong
- Successor: Emperor Tianzuo
- Born: Chala (Khitan name); Yelü Hongji (sinicised name); 14 September 1032
- Died: 12 February 1101 (aged 68)
- Burial: Yongfu Mausoleum (永福陵, in present-day Bairin Right Banner, Inner Mongolia)
- Spouse: Xiao Guanyin; Xiao Tansi
Names
- Family name: Yēlǜ (耶律); Khitan given name: Chálā (查剌); Sinicised given name: Hóngjī (洪基)
Era dates
- Qingning (清寧): 1055–1064); Xianyong (咸雍): 1065–1074; Dakang (大康): 1075–1084; Da'an (大安): 1085–1094; Shouchang (壽昌): 1095–1101
Posthumous name
- Emperor Rensheng Daxiao Wen (仁聖大孝文皇帝)
Temple name
- Daozong (道宗)
- House: Yelü
- Dynasty: Liao
- Father: Emperor Xingzong
- Mother: Empress Xiao Dali

Emperor Daozong of Liao
- Traditional Chinese: 遼道宗
- Simplified Chinese: 辽道宗
Transcriptions
Standard Mandarin
- Hanyu Pinyin: Liáo Dàozōng

Chala (Khitan name)
- Chinese: 查剌
Transcriptions
Standard Mandarin
- Hanyu Pinyin: Chálā

Yelü Hongji (sinicised name)
- Chinese: 耶律洪基
Transcriptions
Standard Mandarin
- Hanyu Pinyin: Yēlǜ Hóngjī

Emperor Daozong of Liao (14 September 1032 – 12 February 1101), personal name Chala, sinicised name Yelü Hongji, was the eighth emperor of the Khitan-led Liao dynasty of China.

== Life ==
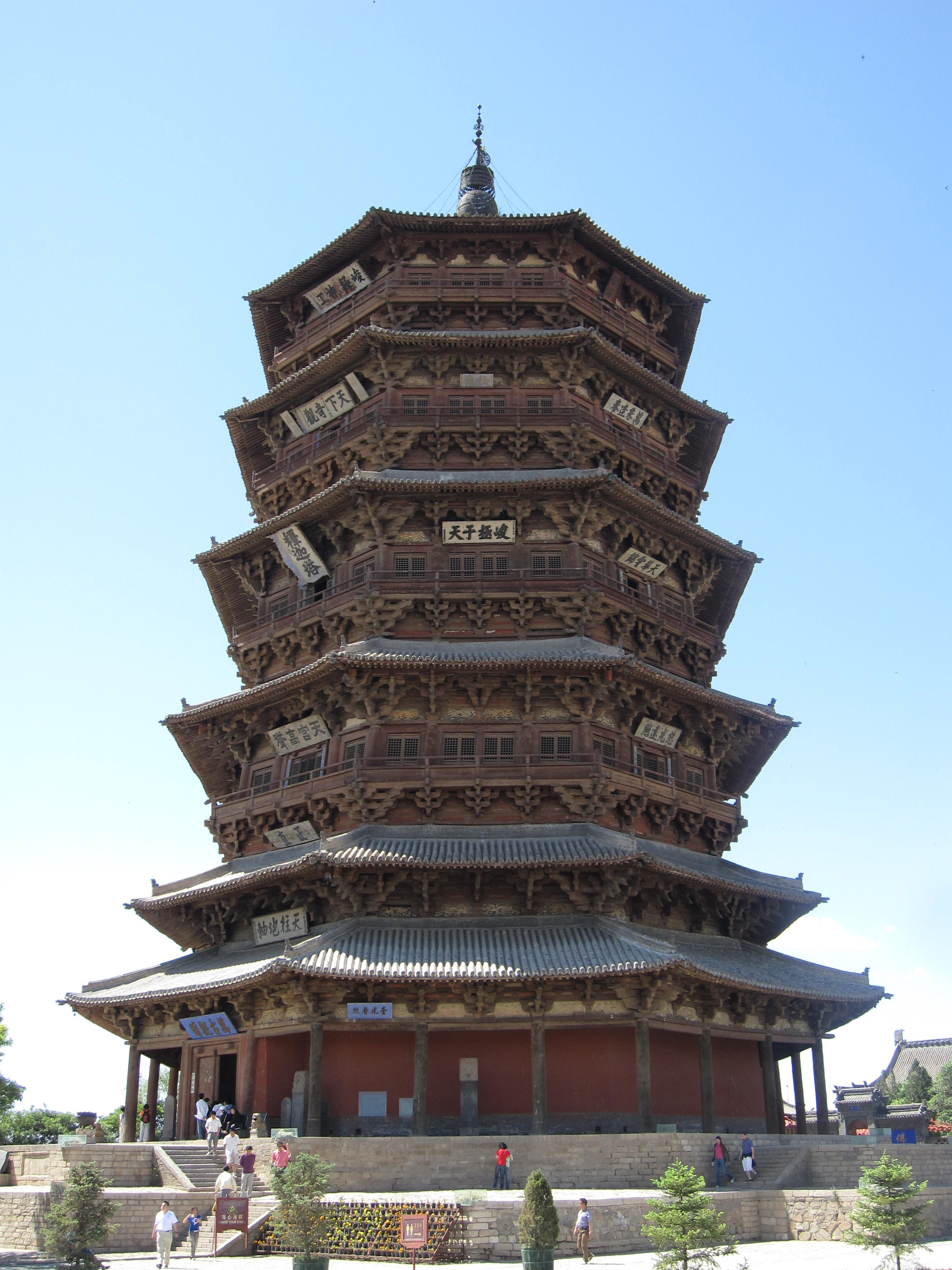
The Pagoda of Fugong Temple, built in 1056 at the site of Daozong's grandmother's family home in Ying County, Shanxi.

Emperor Daozong succeeded his father, Emperor Xingzong, in 1055. He was notable for reviving the official dynastic name "Great Liao" in 1066, a designation first given the empire by the Emperor Taizong in 947. Other noteworthy achievements made during his reign include the completion of a Liao edition of the Buddhist Tripitaka and the construction of the Sakyamuni Pagoda in 1056.

In the early years of Daozong's reign, the court was dominated by two men, Xiao Ge and Xiao Ala. Xiao Ala was the son of Xiao Xiaomu and part of Xiao Noujin's extended family. He was a close friend of Xingzong and had served as state counselor and viceroy of the Eastern Capital. He was also married to an imperial princess. Upon Daozong's accession, Ala was made northern commissioner for military affairs, putting him alongside Xiao Ge as two of the most powerful men at court. The two had a falling out and Ala asked to retire. Instead he was sent to be viceroy of the Eastern Capital in 1059. In 1061 he returned to court and voiced harsh criticisms at the government. Ge denounced him to the emperor, and in spite of Empress Dowager Renyi's pleas, the emperor ordered Ala's execution by strangulation. This left the court in the hands of Xiao Ge (who retired the next year), Yelü Renxian, and Yelü Yixin. Yixin grew up in poverty but rose to become a palace attendant under Xingzong and by the end of his reign, a guard commander. Under Daozong, Yixin was made southern chancellor and then transferred to the northern Chancellery in 1059. Renxian rose to prominence during negotiations with the Song in 1042. In 1060 Zhongyuan tried to have Renxian, who opposed his faction, removed from the southern Chancellery, but Yixin interceded on his behalf by going directly to Daozong.

In 1059 the tribal judges were ordered to refer all capital cases to the local prefect or magistrate for review. If anyone claimed that the sentence was unjust, it was passed to the central government for a decision. This possibly led to the rebellion of pro-Khitan elements under Zhongyuan in 1063. In 1061, Zhongyuan's son Nielugu was appointed southern commissioner for military affairs and became a figurehead for dissident noblemen. Chief among the dissidents was Xiao Hudu, the northern commissioner for military affairs. In 1063, the dissidents ambushed Daozong while he was out on a hunting trip. Daozong was wounded when his horse fell to crossbowmen. He was saved by his servants while his mother, the Empress Dowager Renyi (Xiao Tali), led the guards to ward off the attackers. Nielugu was killed by a stray arrow, Hudu fled and drowned himself, and Zhongyuan also fled and committed suicide. Yelü Ming, viceroy of the Southern Capital and a co-conspirator in the rebellion, did not give up when he heard of Zhongyuan's demise. He led a force of Kumo Xi into the capital and armed them with weapons but his deputy governor mobilized the Chinese garrison to resist them. Ming was executed. All the conspirators and their families, among them Xiao Ge, were executed, resulting in extensive changes in Liao leadership.

In order to reassert his legitimacy as emperor, he was forced to perform a traditional "rebirth" ceremony. In 1070, he restructured the Liao legal system to reflect the differences in Han and Khitan customs.

Vast territory, few people, only an occasional hostel stop.
Mountains and scenery much unlike the splendour of the Central Kingdom.
Along the road of white sands leading away from Yuanyangpo,
The flowers and shrubs, though fragrant, give us no joy.
Envoys of Han, nightly we sleep in the lamplight of felt tents
While the rocky cliffs of these borderlands inspire the flautists.
During our return I take up a mirror to view my countenance
And tremble to discover more greying hair at my temples.

— A poem composed by Chen Xiang, a Song envoy visiting Liao in 1067

Yelü Renxian, the only man whose influence rivaled Yelü Yixin, died in 1072. In 1075, Daozong's son and heir apparent, Prince Jun, who was both well educated and skilled as a horseman and archer, emerged as a potential threat to Yixin's influence over Daozong. Yixin first set in motion plans to eliminate his mother, Xiao Guanyin. Her household members accused her of an affair with a palace musician named Zhao Weiyi. Yixin and his ally, the Han scholar Zhang Xiaojie, fabricated evidence that the empress had written erotic poems to Zhao. Daozong ordered Zhao and his clan executed and the empress, Xiao Guanyin, to commit suicide. Yelü Jun swore revenge for her mother's death and shortly after her suicide, Yixin survived an attempted assassination. Xiao Guanyin was replaced by the sister of one of Yixin's henchmen, Xiao Xiamo, whose other sister was married to Yixin's son. After the death of Empress Dowager Renyi in 1076, the new empress, Xiao Tansi, was installed. The next year, Yixin implicated a number of officials with plotting a coup to replace Daozong with Jun. While the emperor was initially unmoved, Yixin fabricated a false confession by Jun, resulting in his demotion to commoner status and imprisonment. Yixin then sent emissaries to kill Jun and persuaded the viceroy of the Supreme Capital to report his death as a result of illness. Jun's wife was also killed when she was summoned to court by Daozong, who had almost immediately come to regret his actions.

The new empress remained barren so Daozong decided upon Jun's son, Yelü Yanxi, as heir. In 1079 when the emperor was about to leave on his winter hunting trip, Yixin tried to persuade him to leave Yanxi behind. Various courtier immediately protested this and convinced Daozong to take his grandson with him. This event seemed to have resulted in Yixin's fall from power. In 1080 Yixin was demoted and sent to Xingzhong. A year later he was found guilty of trading prohibited goods with a foreign state and sentenced to death. Zhang Xiaojie and the new empress were both exiled, although Zhang would later be allowed to return and died peacefully in the late 1080s. From then on, Yanxi was carefully groomed for the throne. In 1086 Daozong showed him the armour and weapons of Abaoji and Emperor Taizong of Liao, describing to him the hardships of the campaigns on which the dynasty was founded. A few weeks later Yanxi underwent a rebirth ceremony. In 1088 he was assigned to his first office. A year later he was married and sons were born in 1089 and 1093.

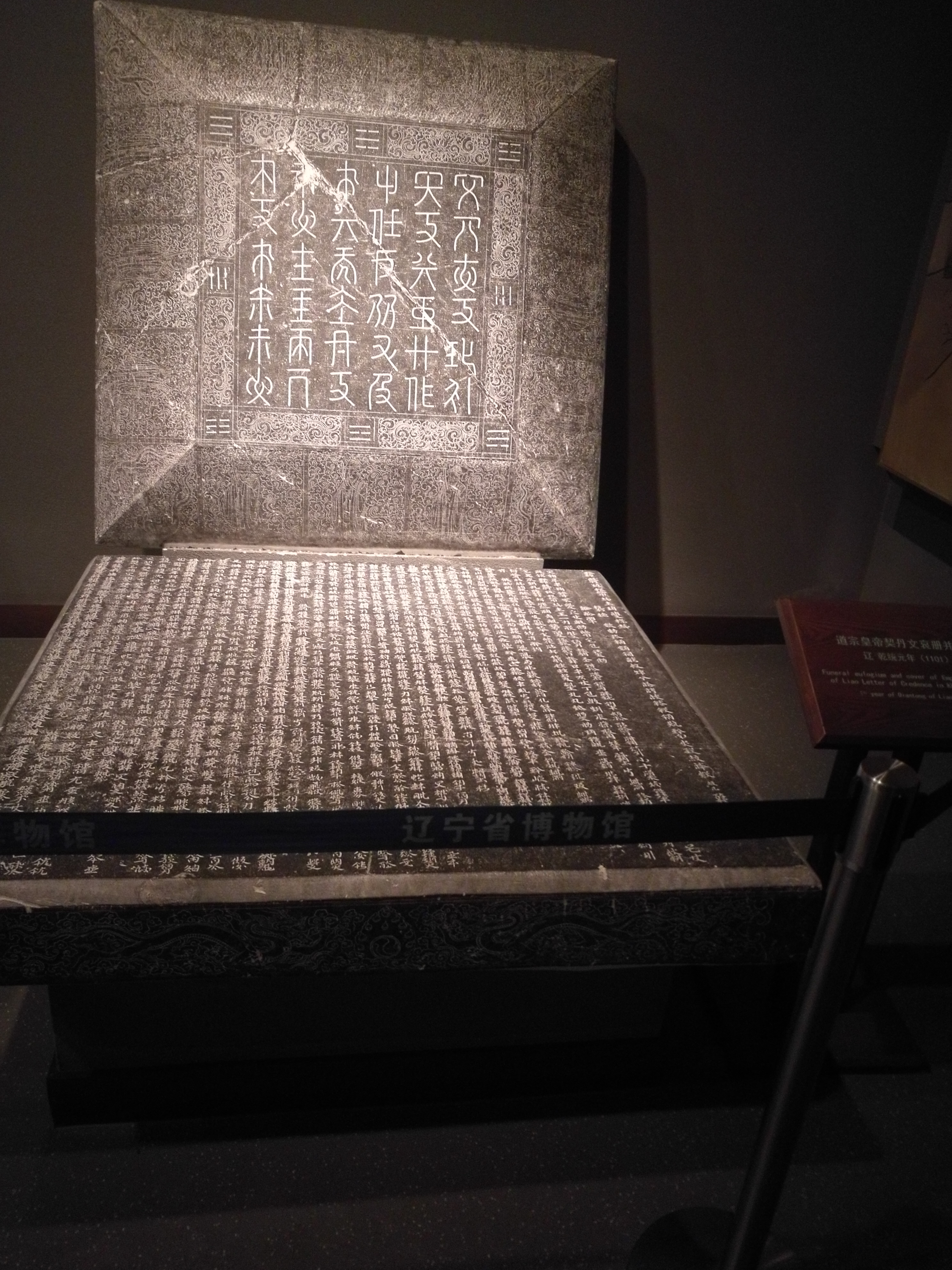
Epitaph for Emperor Daozong

Emperor Daozong's reign was fraught with corruption. He spent lavishly on his palaces and his Buddhist worship. Many people under his rule were angered by the high taxes and began to rebel against the Liao dynasty, most notably the Jurchen tribes which would eventually establish the Jin dynasty and overthrow the Liao dynasty.

The emperor of the Northern Court [i.e., Liao] appears to be over sixty years old, yet he remains vigorous and healthy; his appetite has not yet begun to decline. Having been on the throne so long, he has quite a good understanding of what is to [Liao's] advantage. [Liao's] friendship with our court has lasted many years, such that tribal and Han people enjoy tranquil existences, all living together in harmony, with no desire for war. Moreover, [the emperor's] grandson, the Prince of Yan, is young and fragile. In one of the past years, powerful Khitan courtiers had his father executed. Thus, he has been seeking revenge, and looks for support from Chinese and from our court to consolidate his position. North of the border [i.e., in Liao territory], even commoners speak of this. After I crossed the border with my retinue [while on a diplomatic mission], I witnessed [Liao's] wise, old officials … all speaking of our [two courts’] friendship, with a deep sigh, as something unprecedented since antiquity. They also related to me that the emperor of the Northern Court treats those in charge of southern [i.e., Song] envoys very generously. One of the reception officials was [promoted to] deputy Hanlin commissioner even before we reached the Great Tent [of the Liao emperor] … Everybody said it was in recognition of his work receiving the southern envoy. From this, we can see that, as long as the emperor of the Northern Court remains healthy, we can be certain our northern frontier [with Liao] will remain free of incidents. [The problem] is only that his grandson, the Prince of Yan, is mediocre and weak in spirit, undignified in appearance, and [so] does not live up to his grandfather. Though his heart may seem to turn to China, we do not yet know whether or not, after he attains [the throne], he will be able to suppress the conflict between tribal and Han people, and secure his position.

— Su Che, a Song envoy, reporting his findings after a 1089 mission to Liao

== Family ==
Consort and issue(s):

- Empress Xuanyi, of the Xiao clan (宣懿皇后 蕭氏, 1040–13 December 1075), personal name Guanyin (觀音), first cousin once removed
  - Yelü Jun, Crown Prince Zhaohuai (耶律濬 昭懷太子, 1058 – 1077) (Note: father of Emperor Tianzuo of Liao.), 1st son. Father of Emperor Tianzuo
  - Princess of Wei (魏國公主), personal name Sagezhi (撒葛只), 1st daughter
    - Married Xiao Xiamo (蕭霞抹)
  - Princess of Zhao (趙國公主, d. 1089), personal name Jiuli (糾里), 2nd daughter
    - Married Xiao Tabuye, Prince of Lanling (蘭陵郡王 蕭撻不也)
  - Imperial Princess Liang of Song (梁宋國大長公主), personal name Teli (特里), 3rd daughter
    - Married Xiao Chouwu (蕭酬斡)
    - Married Xiao Temo (蕭特末) and had issue (two sons)
- Grand Consort Dowager Feng, of the Xiao clan (太皇太妃 蕭氏, d. 1181), personal name Tansi (坦思) (Note: Younger sister of Xiao Xiamo (蕭霞抹); she was actually an Empress Consort, but later was demoted into "Gracious Consort" (惠妃, Huifei).) – No issue.
- Lady, of the Xiao clan (蕭氏), personal name Wotelan (斡特懶) (Note: His second wife, Xiao Tansi's little sister. Lady Wotelan was actually already married to Yelü Sui (耶律綏) but later was taken into the Harem Palace by Daozong own.) – No issue.

== Bibliography ==
- Tackett, Nicholas (2017), The Origins of the Chinese Nation
- Twitchett, Denis (1994), "The Liao", The Cambridge History of China, Volume 6, Alien Regime and Border States, 907–1368, Cambridge: Cambridge University Press, pp. 43–153, ISBN 0521243319
- Wright, David (2005), From War to Diplomatic Parity in Eleventh Century China, Brill

Emperor Daozong of Liao House of Yelü (916–1125) Born: 1032 Died: 1101
Regnal titles
Preceded by Emperor Xingzong	Emperor of the Liao Dynasty; 1055–1101	Succeeded by Emperor Tianzuo
