= Yelü Pusuwan =

Yelü Pusuwan 耶律普速完

Regent of the Western Liao dynasty
- Regency: 1163–1177
- Predecessor: Yelü Yilie (as emperor)
- Successor: Yelü Zhilugu (as emperor)
- Died: 1177
- Spouse: Xiao Duolubu (蕭朵魯不)
Era name and dates
- Chóngfú (崇福): 1164–1178
Regnal name
- Empress Dowager Chéngtiān (承天太后)
- House: Yelü
- Dynasty: Western Liao
- Father: Yelü Dashi
- Mother: Xiao Tabuyan
- Religion: Buddhism

Yelü Pusuwan (Chinese: 耶律普速完; pinyin: Yēlǜ Pǔsùwán; died 1177) was regent of the Western Liao dynasty (Qara Khitai) during the minority of her nephew Yelü Zhilugu from 1163 to 1177. She was the younger sister of the Western Liao emperor Yelü Yilie (Emperor Renzong).

== Reign ==
She stepped up as regent when her older brother Yelü Yilie died, since his son Yelü Zhilugu was still a minor.

In 1165, Masud II pillaged Balkh and Andkhoy with Pusuwan's support. After punitive expeditions in 1169 and 1172, Qara Khitai army crushed Il-Arslan, who soon died. His death caused civil war in Khwarazmid realm — his wife Terken Khatun enthroned Sultan Shah, while another son Tekish fled to Qara Khitai and asked for help. Around this time, Mu'ayyid al-Din Ai-Aba sent a tribute to empress.

Yelü Pusuwan sent her husband Xiao Duolubu (蕭朵魯不) with a huge army who defeated Sultan Shah, and put Tekish to throne on 11 December 1172.

In eastern border, she tried subdue Naimans and Qanglis unsuccessfully by sending her general Erbuz (額兒布思).

After a while, Tekish fed up with growing Qara Khitai demands of tribute and killed an emissary sent by Pusuwan, who was her relative. This caused Pusuwan to favor Sultan Shah. Xiao Duolubu was sent again, this time to dethrone the very man he had crowned.

While Duolubu was away, she was infatuated with his brother Xiao Puguzhi (蕭樸古只). She created Duolubu as "Pacifier of East" (東平王) but spent more time lately with her new lover. When her father-in-law Xiao Wolila (蕭斡里剌) found about the relationship, he surrounded the palace and killed both lovers.

Her nephew, Yelü Zhilugu, was installed as new emperor.

Yelü Pusuwan House of Yelü (1163–1177) Born: ? Died: 1177
Regnal titles
Preceded by Emperor Renzong	Regent of the Liao Dynasty; 1163–1177	Succeeded by Yelü Zhilugu
Preceded by Emperor Renzong	Gurkhan of Qara Khitai; 1163–1177	Succeeded by Yelü Zhilugu
