= Emperor Tianzuo of Liao =

Emperor of the Liao dynasty from 1101 to 1125

Emperor Tianzuo of Liao 遼天祚帝

Emperor of the Liao dynasty
- Reign: 12 February 1101 – 26 March 1125
- Predecessor: Emperor Daozong
- Successor: Dynasty abolished (Yelü Dashi as Emperor of the Western Liao dynasty)
- Born: Yelü Yanxi; Aguo (infant name); 5 June 1075
- Died: 1128 (aged 53)/1156 (aged 81)
- Spouse: Xiao Duolilan
Era dates
- Qiantong (乾統; 1101–1110); Tianqing (天慶; 1111–1120); Baoda (保大; 1121–1125)
Regnal name
- Emperor Tianzuo (天祚皇帝)
- House: Yelü
- Dynasty: Liao
- Father: Yelu Jun
- Mother: Lady Xiao

Emperor Tianzuo of Liao
- Traditional Chinese: 遼天祚帝
- Simplified Chinese: 辽天祚帝
Transcriptions
Standard Mandarin
- Hanyu Pinyin: Liáo Tiānzuò Dì

Aguo (infant name)
- Chinese: 阿果
Transcriptions
Standard Mandarin
- Hanyu Pinyin: Āguǒ

Yelü Yanxi (sinicised name)
- Chinese: 耶律延禧
Transcriptions
Standard Mandarin
- Hanyu Pinyin: Yēlǜ Yánxǐ

Yanning (courtesy name)
- Traditional Chinese: 延寧
- Simplified Chinese: 延宁
Transcriptions
Standard Mandarin
- Hanyu Pinyin: Yánníng

Emperor Tianzuo of Liao (5 June 1075 – 1128 or 1156), personal name Yelü Yanxi, courtesy name Yanning, was the ninth and last emperor of the Khitan-led Liao dynasty of China. He succeeded his grandfather, Emperor Daozong, in 1101 and reigned until the fall of the Liao dynasty in 1125.

== Jin invasion ==
During the reign of Emperor Tianzuo, the Jurchen tribes led by Wanyan Aguda established the Jin dynasty in 1115. Aguda formed the Alliance Conducted at Sea with the Han-led Northern Song dynasty against the Liao dynasty, and began to establish authority over former Liao territory in Outer Mongolia. Emperor Tianzuo, however, proved incompetent in dealing with the Jin threat, and in 1115 a coup was attempted by Liao generals to install his uncle Yelü Chun to the throne but was thwarted. Jin troops advanced from Manchuria in 1117, and captured the Liao supreme capital in 1120, then its central capital in 1122.

Another coup was attempted in 1121 to install Emperor Tianzuo's son, the Prince of Jin, on the throne, but was again thwarted. The prince was executed, and most of the coup participants defected to the Jin dynasty. In 1122, Emperor Tianzuo fled from Nanjing (present-day Beijing) to the western regions. His uncle Yelü Chun then founded the short-lived Northern Liao dynasty in Nanjing, but died soon afterwards, and Nanjing was conquered by the Jin dynasty at the end of 1122 or in early 1123.

== End of the Liao dynasty ==
After the end of the Northern Liao dynasty, the general Yelü Dashi rejoined Emperor Tianzuo. In 1123, Jin troops captured Emperor Tianzuo's palace at Qingzhong (south of present-day Hohhot), capturing members of his family. Emperor Tianzuo fled to the Western Xia and sought refuge there. Later, Emperor Tianzuo expressed his intention to attack the Jin dynasty, but Yelü Dashi withheld his support, considering it folly as the Jin dynasty was too militarily powerful. In 1124, Yelü Dashi fled to the west with a band of his followers, and established the Western Liao dynasty. In 1125, Emperor Tianzuo was captured by the Jin dynasty, thereby marking the collapse of the Liao dynasty.

== Death ==
Emperor Tianzuo's death is a subject of debate. In History of Liao, it was stated that Emperor Tianzuo died in 1128 from illness at the age of 53. According to Da Song Xuanhe Yishi (大宋宣和遗事), it was stated that in 1156, the Jin emperor who at the time was the Prince of Hailing ordered him and the former Emperor Qinzong of Song to compete in a match of polo in an act of humiliation. After the weak and frail Emperor Qinzong quickly fell off the horse and was trampled to death, Yelü Yanxi, who was more familiar with horse riding, and tried to escape, but was shot to death by Jurchen archers. He was 81. However, the latter event is largely fictitious, as Da Song Xuanhe Yishi is a novel written during the Yuan dynasty.

== Titles ==
- Prince of Liang (1081–1084)
- Prince of Yan (1084–1101)
- Emperor of Liao (1101–1125)
- Prince of Haibin (1125–1128/1156)

== Family ==
Consort and issue(s):

- Empress Xiao, of the Xiao clan (蕭皇后 蕭氏), personal name Duolilan (奪里懶) – No issue.
- Virtuous Consort, of the Xiao clan (德妃 蕭氏), personal name Shigu (師姑)
  - Yelü Talu, the Prince of Yan (耶律撻魯 燕國王, d. 1104), 3rd son
- Consort Wen, of the Xiao clan (文妃 蕭氏, 1080 – 1121), personal name Sese (瑟瑟)
  - Yelü Aoluwo, the Prince of Jin (耶律敖盧斡 晉王, d. 1122), 1st son
  - Princess of Shu State (耶律余里衍 蜀國公主), personal name Yuliyan (余里衍), 3rd daughter
- Consort Yuan, of the Xiao clan (元妃 蕭氏), personal name Guige (貴哥)
  - Yelü Yali, the Prince of Liang (耶律雅里 梁王, 1094 – 1123), 2nd son
  - Yelü Ding, the Prince of Qin (耶律定 秦王), 5th son
  - Yelü Ning, the Prince of Xu (耶律寧 許王), 6th son
  - Princess Yelü (耶律氏), personal name Woliyan (斡里衍), 4h daughter
  - Princess Yelü (耶律氏), personal name Da'oye (大奥野), 5th daughter
  - Princess Yelü (耶律氏), personal name Ci'aoye (次奥野), 6th daughter
- Zhaorong, of the Zhao clan (昭容 赵氏)
  - Yelü Xinilie, the Prince of Zhao (耶律習泥烈 趙王), 4th son
- Palace Lady, of the Unknown clan (宮人)
  - Princess Yelü (耶律氏), personal name Guyu (骨欲), 2nd daughter
- Unknown
  - Princess Yelü (耶律氏), 1st daughter

Emperor Tianzuo of Liao House of Yelü (916–1125) Born: 1075 Died: 1128 or 1156
Regnal titles
Preceded by Emperor Daozong	Emperor of the Liao dynasty 1101–1125	Succeeded by Emperor Dezong as Emperor of Western Liao dynasty
Preceded by Emperor Daozong	Emperor of Northern China; 1101–1125	Succeeded by Emperor Taizong of Jin
