= Gurkhan =

Monarchical title

Gurkhan (simplified Chinese: 菊儿汗; traditional Chinese: 菊兒汗; pinyin: Jú'erhán) was a Mongol title meaning "Universal Ruler" and roughly equivalent to the older term khagan. It was held by the rulers of the Western Liao dynasty in the 13th century. The title was first adopted by Yelü Dashi (Emperor Dezong of Western Liao) in 1132.

== See also ==
- Beg
- Khan (title)
- Mirza
