= Mongol campaigns in Siberia =

Part of the Mongol conquests

- Part of Mongol invasions and conquests
Date	1201–1308
Location	Siberia, Central Asia, and Northeast China
Result	Mongol Empire subjugates large portions of Siberia and Northeast China

Belligerents
Mongol Empire	Uriankhai; Oirats; Barga; Khakas; Buryats; Tuvans; Khori-Tumed; Yenisei Kyrgyz Khaganate; Remnant forces of the Merkits and Naimans; Cumania; Jin dynasty; Later Liao; Eastern Xia; Nivkh; Udege; Ainu; Others

In the 13th century, the Mongol Empire launched several military expeditions in the region of Siberia as part of its invasions and conquests. The first campaigns in North Asia involved the rise of Genghis Khan in the first decade of the 13th century and the early territorial expansion of his empire into South Central and southern Western Siberia. This early period of expansion gained the Mongol Empire access to trade and tribute all the way north to the Arctic Ocean in certain areas. Further expansion in North Asia and into historic Manchuria continued throughout the 13th century, including against northern possessions of Cumania and the Jin dynasty, and into as late as the early 14th century with the securing of the Sakhalin island.

== Jochi campaigns ==
=== First campaign (1207–1209) ===
By 1206, Genghis Khan had conquered all Mongol and Turkic tribes in Mongolia and the southern borderlands of Siberia and established the Mongol Empire. In 1207, he sent his eldest son Jochi to conquer the Siberian "Forest People", namely the Uriankhai, the Oirats, the Barga, the Khakas, the Buryats, the Tuvans, the Khori-Tumed, Ursut, Qabqanas, Tubas, Kem-Kemjuit, the Yenisei Kyrgyz Khaganate, and others. The Oirat ruler Qutuqa Beki, who during the rise of Genghis Khan had allied with Genghis Khan's rival and former friend, Jamukha, submitted to the Mongols and secured the alliance through a web of marriages: One of his sons, Inalchi, married Checheyikhen, the second daughter of Börte, Genghis Khan's chief wife; Qutuqa's other son, Torolchi married Qolui, a daughter of Jochi; and Qutuqa's daughter Oghul Qaimish married Tolui, the youngest son of Genghis Khan. When meeting Jochi to offer his submission, he delivered some 10,000 soldiers. By securing an alliance with the Oirat, the Mongols now had access to trade routes extending all the way to the Arctic Ocean. In 1214-1215, Jochi's expedition reached the Nen and the Songhua.

The expedition also encountered remnants of the Merkits and the Naimans, who were enemies of Genghis Khan and opposed his rise to power. Through the guidance of Qutuqa Beki, the campaign tracked the Merkits and Naimans and defeated them at the Irtysh in either late 1208 or very early 1209. The surviving Merkit fled west to the Uyghurs and the Naiman leader Kuchlug fled south to Qara Khitai. After that defeat, the Merkit regrouped at the Chu, in what is present-day southern Kazakhstan and northern Kyrgyzstan, but were again defeated. This was either prior to or after a defeat of a Merkit–Qangli alliance at the Emba. The remaining Merkit were conclusively beaten at either a point between the Khemchik and Yenisei or at a location known as the Jade Valley near the Chu.

=== 1217–1219 rebellions ===
In 1217, the Khori-Tumed, perhaps angered by the presence of Jochi's armies moving westward, revolted against Mongol authority, led by Botoqui Tarqun, the widow of the chieftain Darduqul-Soqor. The Yenisei Kyrgyz Khaganate refused the Mongol demands for soldiers to quash the rebellion. This spread into a general uprising among the so-called Forest Peoples, specifically the Ursut, Qabqanas, Tenlek, and Kešdi. Chormaqan and Qutuqa Beki were captured. Chormagan was taken captive first, due to his alleged depredations of whatever women he found interest in. Qutuqa Beki then tried to negotiate but was instead taken hostage as well. Boroqul, a trusted companion and mentor from Genghis Khan's childhood, led an expedition against the rebellion, despite having a strong premonition of his impending death if he went. He achieved initial successes against the tribes but, while away from the main expeditionary force, was ambushed and killed by Tumed scouts. Incensed at the news of Boroqul's death, Genghis made preparations to personally lead the campaign, but was convinced otherwise by Muqali and Bo'orchu; instead, Jochi was sent, and, accompanied by the general Dorbei Doqshin, he crushed the rebellion during a grueling winter campaign in 1217–18. Jochi led an army against the Kyrgyz and other rebels while Dorbei led the attack on the Tumed. Rather than take the primary road, Dorbei, with considerable time and effort, cut a new path and surprised the Tumed. Because envoys were deemed sacrosanct by the Mongols, and because of Boroqul's death, the Khori-Tumeds were punished severely. Chormagan was restored to power and allowed to continue his wife collecting, the Tumed queen Botoqui was ordered to marry Qutuqa, and a hundred Tumeds were sacrificed in vengeance for Boroqul's death. The Kyrgyz rebellion was also cruelly suppressed and the territory of the Khaganate converted into a handicraft colony. By 1219, Jochi's control of his Siberian territories was secure and he could participate in the conquest of Qara Khitai.

== Western Siberia (1209–1219, 1236-1240s) ==
In portions of southwest Siberia, the Cuman–Kipchak confederation had been encroaching into the lands of the Selkup, Mansi, Khanty, and Bashkirs, forcing them northward or else assimilating them. Merkit survivors of the Battle of Irtysh River had sent an envoy to the Uyghurs, but their envoy was killed by the Uyghurs, who had submitted to the Mongol Empire. The Merkit fled to the Kipchack confederation, specifically among the Qanling. At some point likely between 1209 and 1219, most likely 1217 or 1218, General Subutai was dispatched to deal with these survivors and he, Jebe, and Taghachar, likely joined in force with a Uyghur army, met the Merkit at the Chem River in Central Asia, in what is present-day western Kazakhstan, and destroyed them. Qudu, the surviving son of the late Toqto'a Beki (who was killed at the Battle of the Irtysh), managed to flee with some of the Qanling to what is now northern Kazakhstan. Jebe and Subutai pursued and defeated Qudu, his surviving Merkit, and some of his Qanling allies. In 1236, the westward expansion of Batu Khan, the son of Jochi, smashed into the Kipchaks and incorporated their lands and other portions of Western Siberia into his appanage, which became known as the Golden Horde.

According to Giovanni da Pian del Carpine, after the conquest of Volga Bulgaria and invasion of Hungary the Mongols campaigned northward against the "Parrosites" (Permiaks) and Samoyeds (Nenets) until they reached the Arctic Ocean. Carpine also separately lists the "Parrosites" and Samoyeds as subject people. Likewise, William of Rubruck notes that Mongol imperial domains stretched northward until there were no people, and that the northern subjects were so poor that the Mongols took labor for tribute from them as opposed to goods. The historian Stephen Pow speculates that as the Novgorod Republic submitted and paid taxes to the Mongol Empire, the Novgorodian control of the Northern Dvina, Pechora, and Kola Peninsula, and the Yugra, would likely have passed to the Mongols. He hypothesizes that Norse sagas which mention Tatars in Bjarmaland forcing the inhabitants to flee indicate northern Mongol military operations. Pow also argues that Russian folklore and the accounts of Marco Polo suggest control over, or at least successful expeditions into, up as far north as the Arctic Ocean. Ibn Fadlallah al-Umari also claimed that the Golden Horde controlled from along the Irtysh to the Yugra people - with Islamic traders visiting those domains.

== Securing Northeast Manchuria (1212–1263) ==
In 1211, of the Mongol Empire launched its invasion of the Jin dynasty. The Mongols crushed the Jin armies at the Battle of Yehuling at a mountain pass in Zhangjiakou. While Genghis Khan headed southward, his general Jebe travelled even further east into Manchuria and captured Mukden (present-day Shenyang). The Khitan leader Liu-ke declared his allegiance to Genghis in 1212 and conquered Manchuria from the Jin.

In 1215, the warlord Puxian Wannu, a Jin commander, seceded from Jin and founded Eastern Xia. After the Mongols defeated him in 1216, he sent his son Tege to the Mongols as a hostage in order to pledge his loyalty to the empire. In 1217, due to the futility of establishing a kingdom in the area of Liaoning, he relocated to northeast Manchuria along the border with Korea. That same year, he attempted a rebellion against his Mongol allies. This was swiftly subdued, and Wannu accepted the Mongols as his lords. In 1218, the Eastern Xia armies joined those of the Mongols in pursuit of remnants of the Khitan armies from the Later Liao dynasty which were invading Goryeo territory. At some point after 1221, Wannu broke from the Mongols, and in 1232 the Mongol Empire requested Goryeo to attack Eastern Xia. In 1233, as part of a punitive expedition into Goryeo to force that dynasty's compliance, Ögedai sent Güyük and Alchidai to subdue Eastern Xia. The Mongol armies quickly overwhelmed Eastern Xia and Wannu was beheaded. The conquered territory was given to the youngest brother of the late Genghis Khan, Temüge.

Raids from the Nivkh and the Udege peoples motivated the Mongols to force the submission of the two peoples and establish an administration post at Nurgan (present-day Tyr, Russia) at the junction of the Amur and Amgun rivers in 1263. For the Mongols, subjugating this region gained them tribute, in particular the sable furs from the lower Amur and Sakhalin that were especially favored by the Mongol-Chinese upper class at the time. For the Nivkh, surrendering to the Mongols ensured them a military alliance against the Ainu who had invaded their lands.

== Conquest of Sakhalin (1264–1308) ==
Not long after subjugating the Nivkh in Manchuria, the Mongol Empire received reports from the Nivkh of yearly invasion by the peoples of the east, namely the Guwei – Ainu – and the Yiliyu – "deer", which could refer to any Tungusic peoples. The Mongols attacked Sakhalin on November 30, 1264. The Ainu returned the next year to attack the Nivkh, and the Mongols sent supplies of food and weapons. With the formation of the Mongol-led Yuan dynasty in China, an expedition commanded by Taxiala was launched in 1272 and 1273 but was stymied by raging water in the Strait of Tartary. Taxiala requested permission for another expedition, this time in winter when the narrowest point of the Strait would be frozen over, but this was rejected.

The next record of an invasion on the Ainu was in 1282, when Jurchens under Mongol rule were sent to aid the war effort by making boats to ship supplies across the sea. In 1284, a Mongol expedition was postponed from September to November out of fears that the windy seas might topple the supply boats. Following that campaign, the Mongols sent large armies up to 10,000 men for the expeditions of 1285 and 1286. Led by Tata'erdai and Yangwuludai, the expeditions sailed across the sea in 1000 small boats carrying 10 men each. The Mongol armies apparently reached the southern tip of Sakhalin, since ramparts of a Mongol-Chinese fort dated to the 13th century were discovered at Cape Crillon.

The rebellion of the Mongol prince Nayan in Manchuria forced the Han Chinese troops garrisoning the Amur region to withdraw in 1287. Nine years later, two Nivkh commanders defected to the Ainu, and in 1297 an Ainu force under the chieftain Waying crossed the strait on Nivkh boats and raided settlements on the continent. The Nivkh that were still aligned with the Yuan dynasty warned that the Ainu planned to cross the sea from Guohuo when the sea froze. When the Ainu invaded the Amur estuary in mid-1297, the Yuan met the Ainu army and defeated them near Lake Kizi.

Another Ainu raid was recorded in 1305, one which evaded the Mongol army. In 1308, the Ainu chieftains Waying and Yushannu communicated through the Nivkh that they desired to surrender. An Ainu ambassador went to Nurgan with gifts of swords and armor and promised to pay a tribute of furs every year, ending the conflict.

== Re-occupation of the Kyrgyz and Tuvan river basins (1270–1293) ==
In 1270, Kublai Khan sent a Chinese official, with a new batch of settlers, to serve as judge of the Kyrgyz and Tuvan basin areas. Ogedei's grandson Kaidu occupied portions of Central Siberia from 1275 on. The Yuan dynasty army under Kublai's Kipchak general Tutugh reoccupied the Kyrgyz lands in 1293, which secured the Yuan dynasty large portions of Central and Eastern Siberia.
