= Northeast China Plain =

Alluvial plain in China

Coordinates: 45°00′N 125°00′E

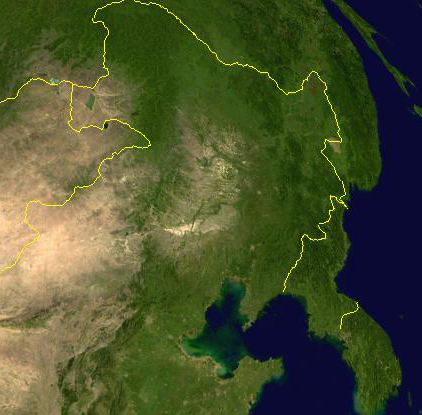
A NASA satellite image of the Northeast Plain (center)

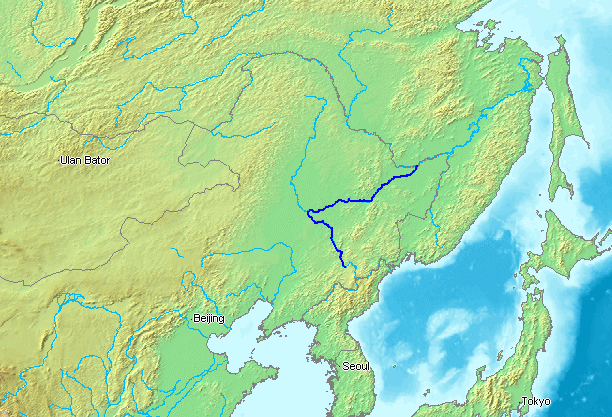
The Northeast China Plain (with the Songhua River highlighted)

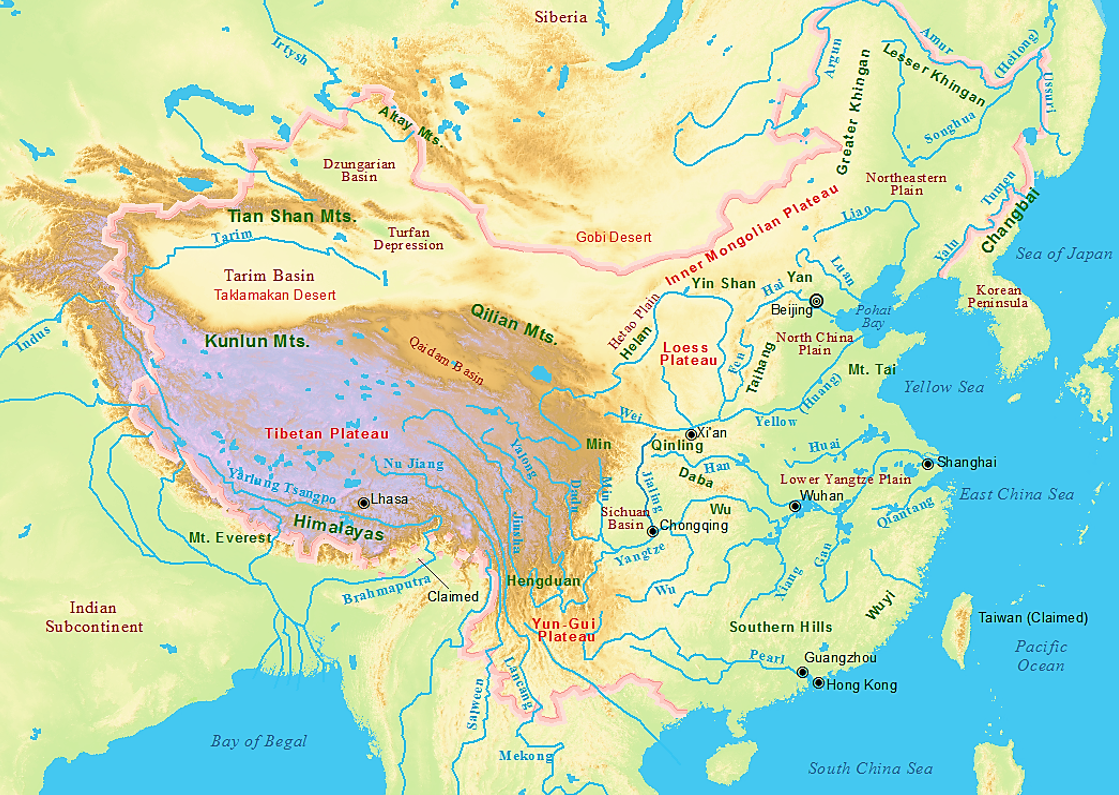
A map of Chinese geographical regions, showing the Northeast Plain's location relative to other regions

The Northeast China Plain or Northeast Plain (simplified Chinese: 东北平原; traditional Chinese: 東北平原; pinyin: Dōngběi Píngyuán), also known as the Manchurian Plain or Songliao Plain, is a lowland plain in Northeast Asia located in a vast, elongated basin formed by the Greater Khingan, Lesser Khingan and the Changbai mountain ranges, and forms the main portion of Northeast China (Inner Manchuria or "Inner Northeast"). Covering approximately 350,000 km^{2} (140,000 sq mi), the Northeast Plain is China's largest plain.

== Geography ==
Distribution of chernozem soils according to the World Reference Base for Soil Resources classification: Dominant (more than 50% of soil cover) Codominant (25–50%) Associated (5–25%)

The Northeast Plain is bounded in the west by the Greater Khingan Range and northern/eastern branches of the Yan Mountains, in the northeast by the Lesser Khingan Range (which separates it from the Zeya–Bureya plains in the Russian Amur Oblast), in the east/southeast by branches of Changbai Mountains (e.g. the Zhangguangcai Range and Qian Mountains, which separates it from the Sanjiang Plain to the northeast) and in the south by the Liaodong Bay of the Bohai Sea. It has a mostly flat topography with an average elevation lower than 200 m (660 ft), and less than 100 m (330 ft) in the southern coastal regions.

The Northeast Plain consists of two primary alluvial plains, namely the Songnen Plain in the north, formed by the catchments of the Songhua River and its main tributary Nen River; and Liaohe Plain in the south, formed by the catchments of the Liao River and its former tributaries Hun and Taizi River. The watershed between the two plains is located among a series of low hills between Tongyu and Gongzhuling in central Jilin province. The alluvial soils of the Songnen and Liaohe Plains contain a large proportion of humus, making it the third-largest chernozem (black soil) region in the world after the East European Plain and the Great Plains. The excellent soil fertility, enhanced by the annual monsoon and snowmelt, is great for agricultural productivity and makes the region one of the most important breadbaskets in China nicknamed the "Great Northern Granary" (Chinese: 北大仓; pinyin: Běi Dà Cāng). The vast, fertile flatlands make the region suitable for large-scale human settlements, especially after the mass migration during the late 19th century.

The plain is home to the three provincial capitals and the first-, second- and fourth-largest cities of Northeast China, i.e. Shenyang, Harbin and Changchun (which are also the 14th-, 21st- and 27th-most populous cities in China according to the 2020 census), as well as the first- and third-largest cities of Inner Mongolia, i.e. Chifeng and Tongliao.

=== Climate ===
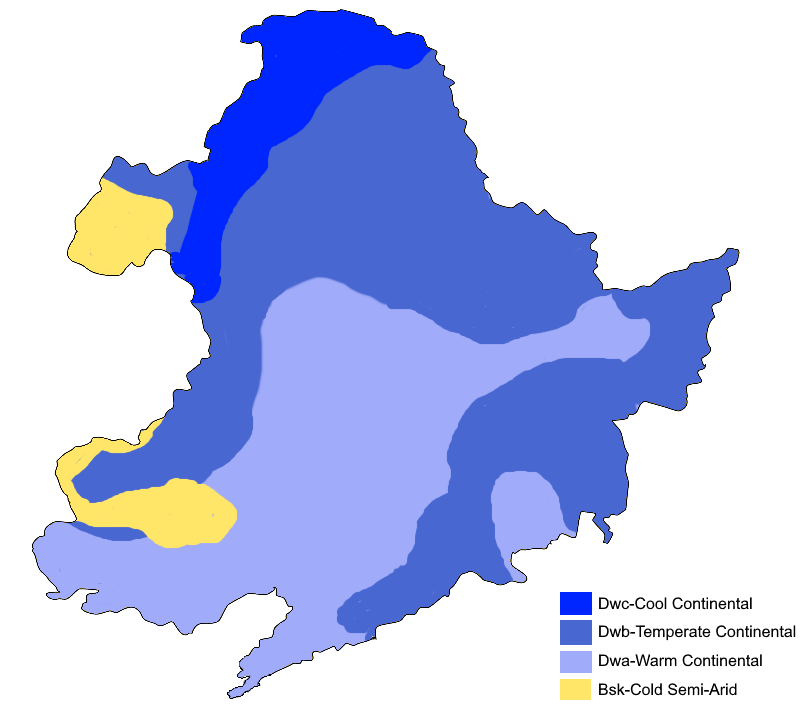
Climate map for Northeast China

As with most northern China regions east of the Heihe–Tengchong line, the Northeast Plain has a hot-summer humid continental climate (Dwa) seasonally subjected to the East Asian monsoon, but has much colder and prolonged winters than many other regions of the same latitudes and elevations (e.g. France, southern Ukraine and coastal Pacific Northwest) due to the southbound cold fronts of the Siberian anticyclone being funnelled and concentrated between the Greater and Lesser Khingans, causing heavy snowfall regionwide and sea ice in Bohai as south as the Laizhou Bay. As a result, the Northeast Plain region are heavily dependent on fossil fuel-intensive district heating and stove beds during winter, which leads to persistent high coal consumption and, together with air pollutions from heavy industries, significantly poorer air qualities despite the relatively moderate population densities compared with other regions of China proper.

== History ==
The Northeast Plain was inhabited by Sushen ethnic groups, who were tribute payers to the Zhou dynasty. The southern Liaohe Plain of the plain was conquered by General Qin Kai of the Yan state in 300 BC, while the northern parts remained sparsely populated by various semi-agrarian/hunter-gatherer peoples collectively known as the Dongyi. After Qin dynasty's unification of China in 221 BC, the southern plains were divided into the commanderies of Liaoxi] and Liaodong, named for their relative positions to a large, untraversable wetland called Liao Mire (simplified Chinese: 辽泽; traditional Chinese: 遼澤; pinyin: Liáo Zé) that existed until the 19th century. The Han dynasty further expanded upon these commanderies by conquering Wiman Chosŏn in 108 BC, and states such as Buyeo existed as sinicized tributary states to the Han dynasty.

The defeat of the Xiongnu nomadic empire by the Han dynasty allowed other nomadic pastoralist tribes of Mongolian-Manchurian steppe such as the Donghu to rise and fill the void, and the decline and eventual collapse of the Han dynasty in the early 3rd century allowed various Donghu tribes such as Wuhuan and Xianbei to expand and invade the Northeast Plain. During the Sixteen Kingdoms and the subsequent Northern and Southern dynasties periods, Xianbei tribes such as Murong and Yuwen dominated the Northeast until the rise of Goguryeo in the 5th century, who became an aggressive expansionist power in Northeast Asia that finally declined after numerous attritions with the Sui dynasty and the Korean states of Paekche and Silla. After the conquest of Goguryeo in 668 AD and defeat of Paekche in 663 AD by the alliance of Tang dynasty and Silla, Parhae ruled over most of the territories in the northern half of the Northeast Plain.

The rise of the Khitans following the collapse of the Tang dynasty in 907 AD led to the conquest of Parhae by the Liao dynasty, and restorationist regimes such as Later Parhae and Chŏngan were all crushed by 986 AD. The Liao dynasty would eventually fall in 1125 AD to a Jurchen rebellion led by the Wanyan clan, who founded the Jin dynasty. In 1213 AD, the Khitans rebelled and established Eastern Liao with Mongol support from Genghis Khan, and Puxian Wannu, the Jin general sent to quell that rebellion, also rebelled himself and established a short-lived regime called Eastern Xia. Both the Jin dynasty and the Eastern Xia would be conquered by the Mongol Empireby 1234 AD, and the Eastern Liao would last as a vassal state of the Mongols until it was abolished in 1269 AD.

The Mongol Yuan dynasty collapsed in 1368 AD due to northern expeditions of the Ming dynasty, and the remnant Mongol dominions in the Northeast Plain fell to the Ming campaign against the Uriankhai in 1387 AD. The Ming dynasty set up guard towns in the southern portions of the Northeast, and placed the remaining north under a Jimi system overseen by the Nurgan Regional Military Commission. However in 1618, Nurhaci, leader of Aisin Gioro clan the Jianzhou Jurchens, rebelled against the Ming dynasty under the pretext of "Seven Grievances", and founded the Later Jin. The Later Jim captured almost all of the Northeast Plain after the Battle of Hun River in 1621 AD, and established the Qing dynasty with the capital based at Shengjing. After Ming dynasty's collapse in 1644 AD due to Li Zicheng's peasant rebellion, the Qing army invaded and conquered China proper and then announced the entire Manchuria as a prohibited region for Han Chinese, with Willow Palisades marking the boundaries.

The Qing prohibition of Han settlement in Manchuria was broken in the mid-19th century, when aggressive expansion of Russian Empire in the Far East existentially threatened the Manchus' hold of the region after the Russian annexation of lands north of the Amur with the Treaty of Aigun. The Qing ruling elites were forced to abandon the Willow Palisade, and millions of Han settlers moved into Manchuria in a large-scale migration called Chuang Guandong. However, the Russians were not the only foreign threat faced by the Qing dynasty, as the Empire of Japan also attempted to infiltrate Manchuria after the First Sino-Japanese War in 1895, especially after the Japanese defeated the Russians in 1905 and the annexed Korea in 1910 AD. After the Xinhai Revolution overthrew the Qing dynasty in 1912, the Northeast Plain became the site of a three-way contest between the Russians, who had influence over the northern half of the region; the Japanese, who controlled zones around the South Manchurian Railway in the southern; and various local Chinese warlords most prominently represented by the Fengtian clique.

In 1928, Fengtian clique warlord Zhang Zuolin, who was also the head of the Beiyang government, was assassinated by bombs planted by the Japanese Kwantung Army. In response, his son and heir Zhang Xueliang submitted to the rival Nanjing government, and the Northeast was nominally under the sovereignty of the Nationalist Government of the Republic of China. This only lasted for three years until the Mukden Incident in 1931, when the Kwantung Army invaded and seized the rest of Manchuria by early 1932 and established the puppet state of Manchukuo. Despite years of bitter struggles by anti-Japanese insurgents, the Japanese occupation of Manchuria continued until the end of the Second World War in August 1945, when the Soviet Union invaded and defeated the Kwantung Army in Manchuria and Inner Mongolia. After a nine-month occupation, the Soviet forces withdrew in mid-1946, not before looting most of the industrial infrastructure left behind by the Japanese. The Fourth Field Army of the People's Liberation Army soon moved in to fill the void, and the Chinese Civil War began. Chinese Communist Party forces eventually captured all of the Northeast with the victorious Liaoshen campaign in late 1948, and the region served as the most important industrial bases for the newly founded People's Republic of China.

== Agriculture ==
It is suitable for mechanized farming, with thick and fertile soil and extensive amounts of arable land. The plain is a major Chernozem-producing region of the world. Huge areas are planted with wheat, corn, soybeans, upland rice, sugar beets, sunflowers, sorghum, and flax. The landscape is rich in resources such as iron ore, coal, and oil. After 1949, land reclamation began on the plain and state farms were established. There are very few trees on this landscape that have not been planted, typically poplars in long rows along roads, or on either side of the train tracks. There are not many fences on the landscape, no long running fences, though there are many wooden or stone fences adjacent to the houses. There is also much wetland, vast marshes, and many areas that are subject to flooding.
