= Mongol conquest of China =

- Part of the Mongol invasions and conquests
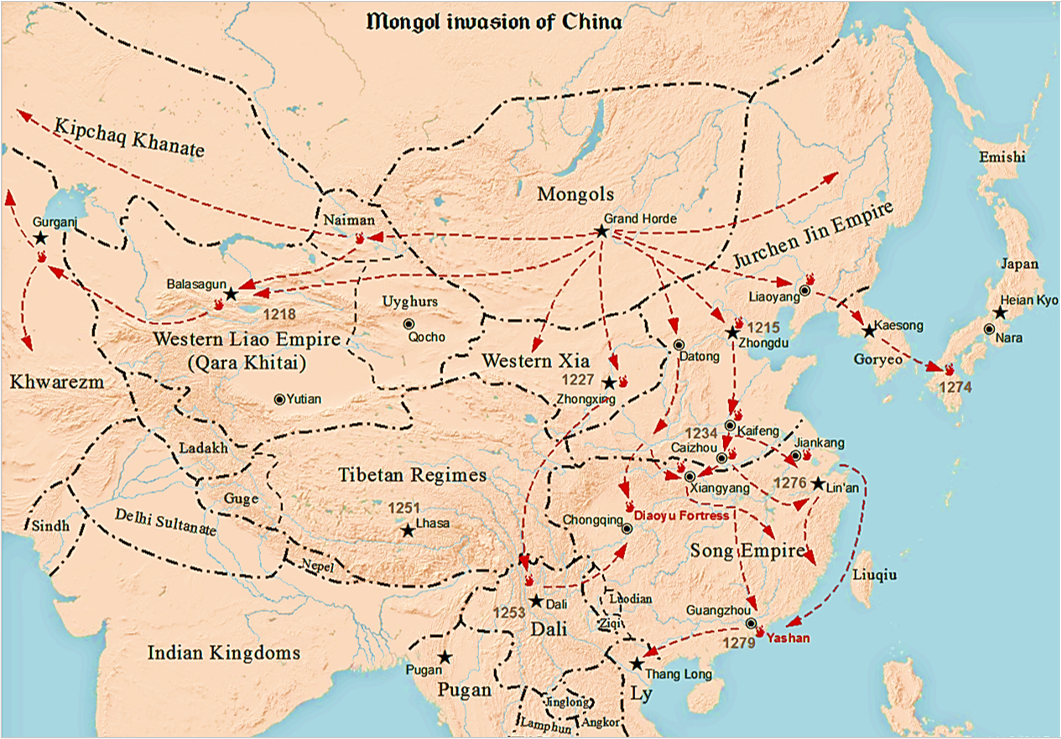
- Mongol campaigns located in modern-day China.
Date	1205–1279 (74 years)
Location	China proper, Mongolian Plateau, Tarim Basin
Result	Mongol victory
Territorial changes	Founding of the Yuan dynasty, and reunification of China

Belligerents
Pre–1234 northern campaigns: Mongol Empire; Western Xia (1210–1219); Southern Song; Eastern Liao; Goryeo	Pre–1234 northern campaigns: Western Xia; Jin; Eastern Xia; Later Liao
Post–1234 southern campaigns: Mongol Empire (until 1271); Yuan (from 1271); Dali Kingdom; Eastern Liao	Post–1234 southern campaigns: Southern Song; Dali Kingdom (1252–1253)

Commanders and leaders
Genghis Khan # or possibly (DOW); Ögedei Khan; Güyük Khan; Möngke Khan (DOW); Kublai Khan; Subutai; Jebe; Muqali; Tolui; Qarachar; Bayan; Aju; Shi Tianze; Zhang Hongfan; Guo Kan	Emperor Huanzong of Western Xia; Emperor Xiangzong of Western Xia (surrendered); Emperor Xianzong of Western Xia; Emperor Mo of Western Xia (executed); Wanyan Yongji X; Emperor Xuanzong of Jin †; Emperor Aizong of Jin †; Emperor Mo of Jin †; Emperor Lizong of Song; Emperor Duzong of Song; Emperor Gong of Song; Emperor Duanzong of Song; Emperor Bing of Song †; Jia Sidao; Zhang Shijie; Wen Tianxiang

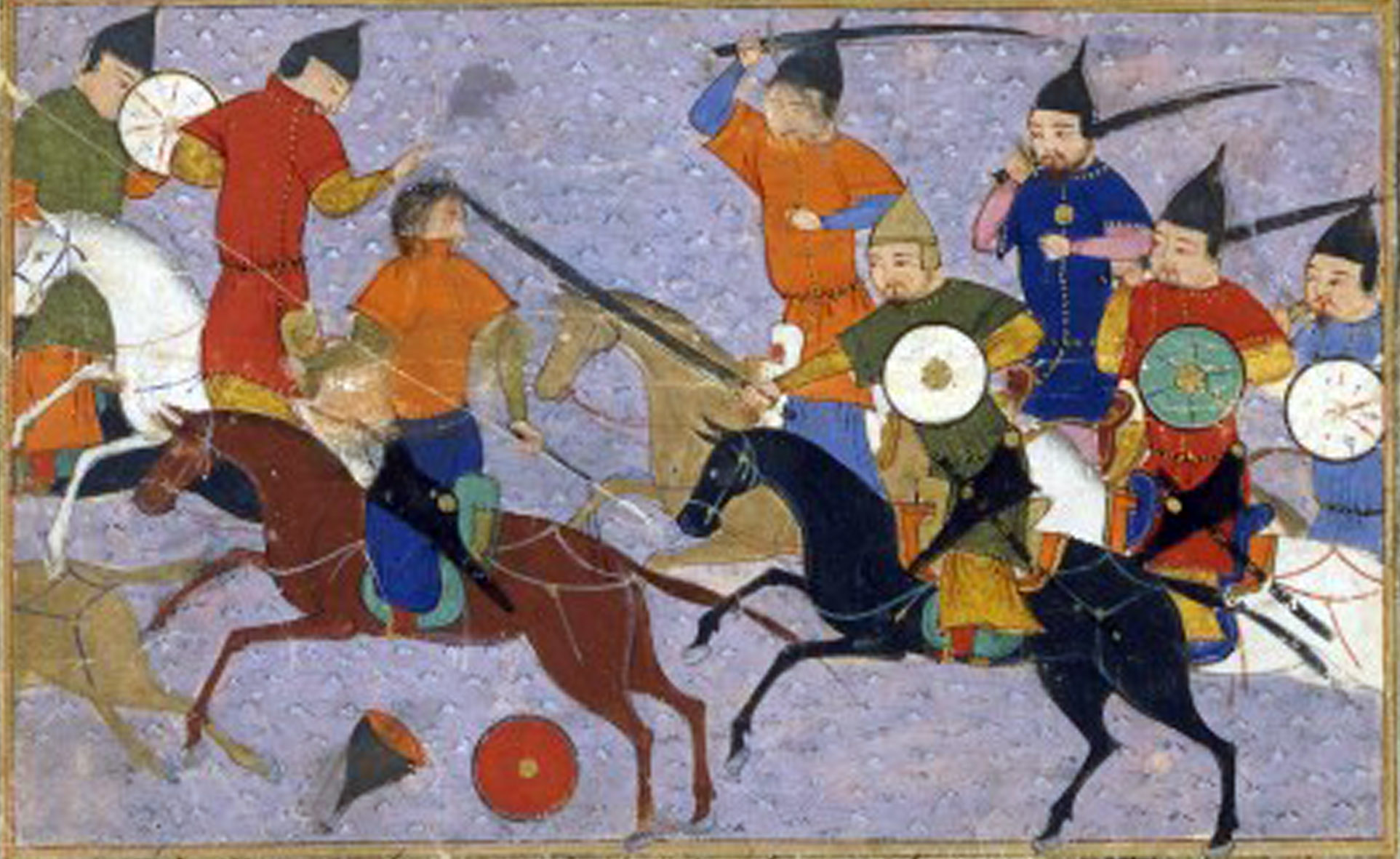
Battle between the Mongol and Jin Jurchen armies in north China in 1211 depicted in the Jami' al-tawarikh (Compendium of Chronicles) by Rashid-al-Din Hamadani.

The Mongol conquest of China was a series of major military efforts by the Mongol Empire to conquer various empires that were ruling over China for 74 years (1205–1279). It included the defeat of the Jin dynasty, Western Liao, Western Xia, Tibet, the Dali Kingdom, the Southern Song, and the Eastern Xia. The Mongol Empire under Genghis Khan started the conquest with small-scale raids into Western Xia in 1205 and 1207.

In 1279, the Mongol ruler Kublai Khan formally established the Yuan dynasty in the Chinese tradition, having crushed the last Song resistance, marking the reunification of China under Mongol rule, the first time that non-Han people had ruled the entire country. It was the first time that Tibet was added to China.

== Conquest of Western Xia ==
In the early 1200s, Temujin, soon to be known as Genghis Khan, began consolidating his power in Mongolia. Following the death of the Kerait leader Ong Khan to Temujin's emerging Mongol Empire in 1203, Kerait leader Nilqa Senggum led a small band of followers into Western Xia. However, after his adherents took to plundering the locals, Nilqa Senggum was expelled from Western Xia territory.

Using his rival Nilga Senggum's temporary refuge in Western Xia as a pretext, Temujin launched a raid against the state in 1205 in the Edsin region. The Mongols plundered border settlements and one local Western Xia noble accepted Mongol supremacy. The next year, 1206, Temujin was formally proclaimed Genghis Khan, ruler of all the Mongols. In 1207, Genghis led another raid into Western Xia, invading the Ordo region and sacking Wuhai, the main garrison along the Yellow River, before withdrawing in 1208.

In 1209, Genghis Khan undertook a larger campaign to secure the submission of Western Xia. After defeating a force led by Kao Liang-Hui outside Wuhai, Genghis captured the city and pushed up along the Yellow River, taking several cities and besieging the capital Yinchuan, which possessed a well-fortified garrison of 150,000. The Mongols were not yet experienced with siege warfare, and attempted to build a dike to divert the Yellow River and flood the city. However, the dike instead broke and flooded the Mongol camp. Emperor Li Anquan, still under threat by the Mongols and receiving no relief from the Jin dynasty, surrendered to the Mongol and demonstrated his loyalty by giving his daughter Chaka to Genghis in marriage, along with a tribute of camels, falcons, and textiles.

After their defeat in 1210, the Western Xia served as faithful Mongol vassals for the following decade, aiding the Mongols against the Jin. In 1219, Genghis Khan launched his campaign against the Khwarazmian dynasty in Central Asia, and requested military aid from Western Xia. However, the emperor and his military commander Asha refused to take part in the campaign, stating that if Genghis had too few troops to attack Khwarazm, then he had no claim to supreme power. Infuriated, Genghis swore vengeance and left to invade Khwarazm, while Western Xia attempted alliances with the Jin and Song dynasties against the Mongols.

After defeating Khwarazm in 1221, Genghis prepared his armies to punish Western Xia for their betrayal, and in 1225 he attacked with a force of approximately 180,000. After taking Khara-Khoto, the Mongols began a steady advance southward. Asha, commander of the Western Xia troops, could not afford to meet the Mongols as it would involve an exhausting westward march from the capital Yinchuan through 500 kilometers of desert, and so the Mongols steadily advanced from city to city. Enraged by Western Xia's fierce resistance, Genghis engaged the countryside in annihilative warfare and ordered his generals to systematically destroy cities and garrisons as they went. Genghis divided his army and sent general Subutai to take care of the westernmost cities, while the main force under Genghis moved east into the heart of the Western Xia Empire and took Ganzhou, which was spared destruction upon its capture due to it being the hometown of Genghis's commander Chagaan.

In August 1226, Mongol troops approached Wuwei, the second-largest city of the Western Xia empire, which surrendered without resistance in order to escape destruction. In Autumn 1226, Genghis took Liangchow, crossed the Helan Shan desert, and in November lay siege to Lingwu, a mere 30 kilometers from Yinchuan. Here, in the Battle of Yellow River, the Mongols claimed to destroy a force of 300,000 Western Xia that launched a counter-attack against them.

Genghis reached Yinchuan in 1227, laid siege to the city, and launched several offensives into Jin to prevent them from sending reinforcements to Western Xia, with one force reaching as a far as Kaifeng, the Jin capital. Yinchuan lay besieged for about six months, after which Genghis opened up peace negotiations while secretly planning to kill the emperor. During the peace negotiations, Genghis continued his military operations around the Liupan mountains near Guyuan, rejected an offer of peace from the Jin, and prepared to invade them near their border with the Song. However, in August 1227, Genghis died of a historically uncertain cause, and, in order not to jeopardize the ongoing campaign, his death was kept a secret. In September 1227, Emperor Mozhu surrendered to the Mongols and was promptly executed. The Mongols then mercilessly pillaged Yinchuan, slaughtered the city's population, plundered the imperial tombs west of the city, and completed the effective annihilation of the Western Xia state.

== Conquest of Jin dynasty ==
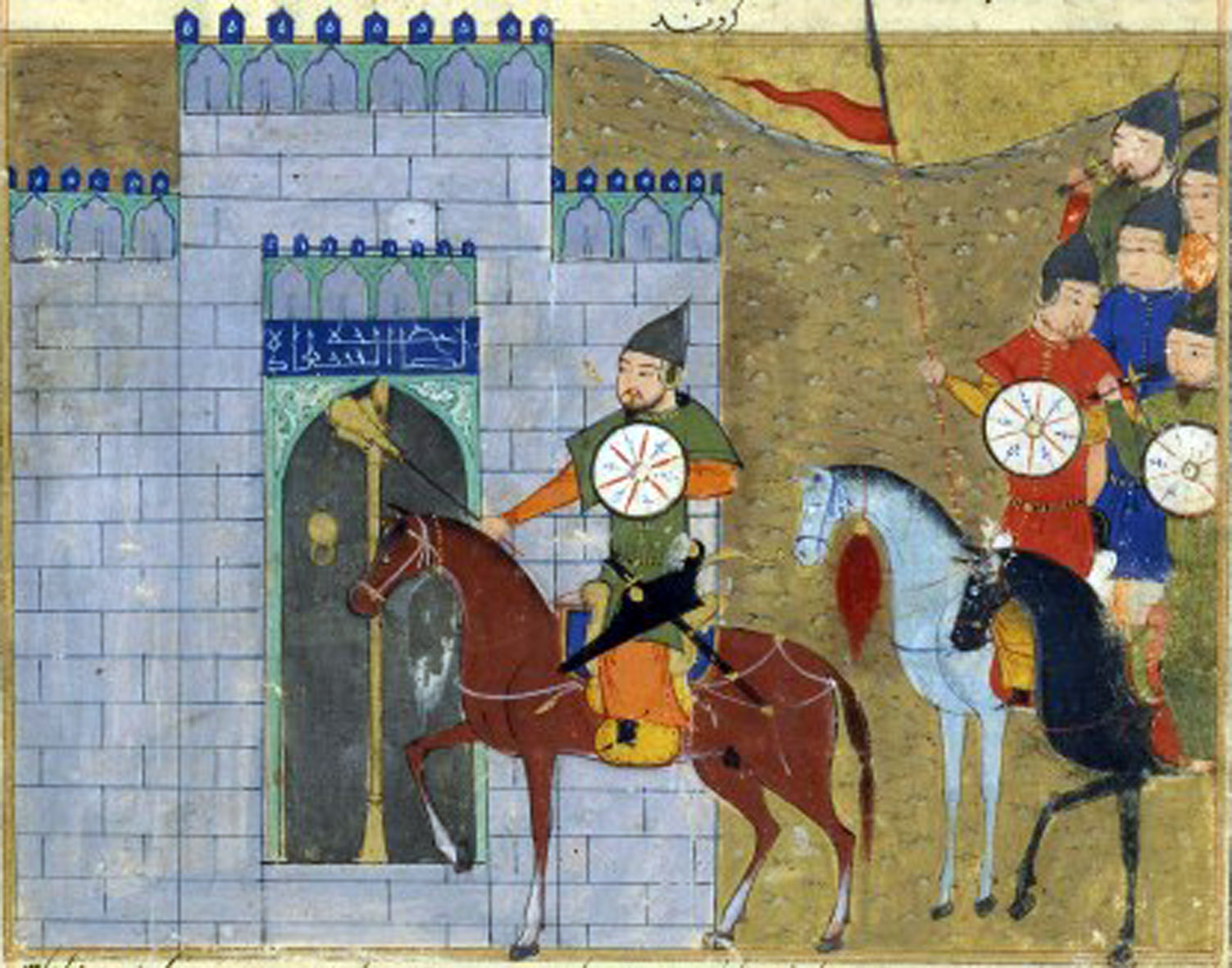
The siege of Zhongdu (modern Beijing) in 1213–14.

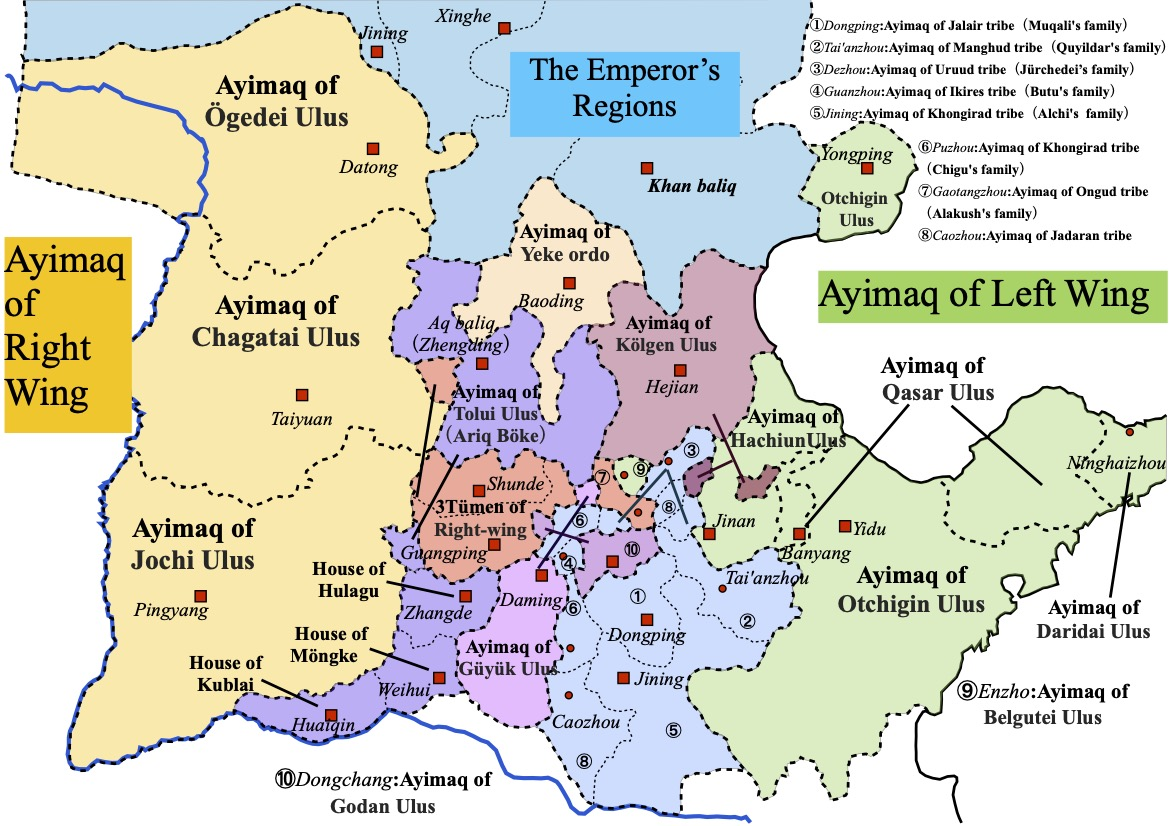
Mongol Empire's Ayimaq in North China

One of the major goals of Genghis Khan was the conquest of the Jin dynasty, allowing the Mongols to avenge the earlier death of a Mongol Khan, gain the riches of northern China and to establish the Mongols as a major power in the East-Asian world. Genghis Khan declared war in 1211, and while Mongols were victorious in the field, they were frustrated in their efforts to take major cities. In response, Genghis and his staff studied assault of fortifications. With the help of Chinese engineers, they gradually developed the techniques to take down fortifications. This eventually made troops under the Mongols some of the most accomplished and most successful besiegers in the history of warfare.

As a result of a number of overwhelming victories in the field and a few successes in the capture of fortifications deep within China, Genghis had conquered and consolidated Jin territory as far south as the Great Wall by 1213. Jin defectors and Han Chinese conscripts were recruited into new armies formed by the Mongols as they destroyed the Jin dynasty, the Cheriks (sedentary soldiers in the Mongol military). The original Han cherik forces were created in 1216 and Liu Bolin appointed as their leading officer, and they carried out a critical role in the defeat of the Jin. For example, Han Chinese defectors led by General Liu Bolin defended Tiancheng from the Jin in 1214 while Genghis Khan was occupied back north, and the next year, Xijing fell to Liu Bolin's army. As Han troops kept defecting from the Jin to the Mongols, the size of the Han cherik forces swelled and they had to be partitioned between different units. Chalaer, Yelu Tuhua and Uyar led three cherik armies in northern China under the Mongol commander Muqali, in addition to his tamma armies in 1217–1218. Han soldiers made up the majority of Yelu Tuhua's army, while Juyin soldiers from Zhongdu made up Chalaer's army and Khitan soldiers made up Uyar's army.

The Mongols received defections from Han Chinese and Khitans while the Jin were abandoned by their own Jurchen officers. Many Han Chinese and Khitan defected to the Mongols to fight against the Jin. Two Han Chinese leaders, Shi Tianze, Liu Heima (劉黑馬, Liu Ni), and the Khitan Xiao Zhala (蕭札剌) defected and commanded 3 Tumens in the Mongol army. Liu Heima and Shi Tianze served Ogödei Khan. Liu Heima and Shi Tianxiang led armies against the Western Xia for the Mongols. There were 4 Han Tumens and 3 Khitan Tumens, with each Tumen consisting of 10,000 troops. The three Khitan Generals Shimobeidier (石抹孛迭兒), Tabuyir (塔不已兒) and Xiao Zhongxi (蕭重喜) commanded three Khitan Tumens and the four ethnic Han Generals Zhang Rou, Yan Shi, Shi Tianze, and Liu Heima commanded four Han tumens under Ogödei Khan.

The first Han armies in the Mongol army were those led by defecting individual officers. There were 1,000 ethnic Han troops each in 26 units, which made up three tumeds arranged by Ogedei Khan on a decimal system. Zhang Rong, Yan Shi and Zhang Rou led three additional tumeds which were created before 1234. The Han defectors were called the "Black Army" (黑軍) by the Mongols before 1235. A new infantry-based "New Army" (新軍) was created after the Mongols received 95,000 additional Han soldiers through conscription once the 1236 and 1241 censuses were taken after the Jin was crushed. The New Army and Black Army had hereditary officer posts like the Mongol army itself. It was such Han cherik forces that were deployed against Li Tan's revolt in 1262. Shi Tianze (Shih T'ien-tse), Zhang Rou (Chang Jou, 張柔), and Yan Shi (Yen Shih, 嚴實) and other high ranking Chinese who served in the Jin dynasty and defected to the Mongols helped build the structure for the administration of the new state. The Mongols valued physicians, craftsmen and religious clerics and ordered them to be spared from death and brought to them when cities were taken in northern China.

Interethnic marriage between ethnic Han and Jurchen became common at this time. The Han Chinese General Shi Tianze's father Shi Bingzhi (史秉直, Shih Ping-chih) was married to a Jurchen woman, while Shi Tianze was married to two Jurchen women (Mo-nien and Na-ho), a Han Chinese woman (Shi), and a Korean woman (Li), and his son Shi Gang was born to one of his Jurchen wives, all of whom were prominent in Yuan court service. Shi Gang married a woman of the Kerait, a Mongolified Turkic people and part of the "Mongol nation".

Genghis advanced with three armies into the heart of Jin territory, between the Great Wall and the Yellow River. With the help of Chenyu Liu, one of the top officers who betrayed the Jin, as well as the Southern Song, who wanted revenge on Jin, Genghis defeated the Jin forces, devastated northern China, captured numerous cities, and in 1215 besieged, captured and sacked the Jin capital of Yanjing (modern-day Beijing). However, the Jin emperor, Xuan Zong, did not surrender, but moved his capital to Kaifeng, which then fell in 1232. Emperor Aizong fled to the town of Caizhou. After this, the ethnic Han general Shi Tianze led troops to pursue Emperor Aizong as he retreated, and destroyed an 80,000-strong Jin army led by Wanyan Chengyi (完顏承裔) at Pucheng (蒲城). The Jin dynasty collapsed after the siege of Caizhou in 1234. Eastern Xia, a short-lived kingdom which declared independence from Jin in 1215, was conquered in 1233.

== Conquest of Dali Kingdom ==
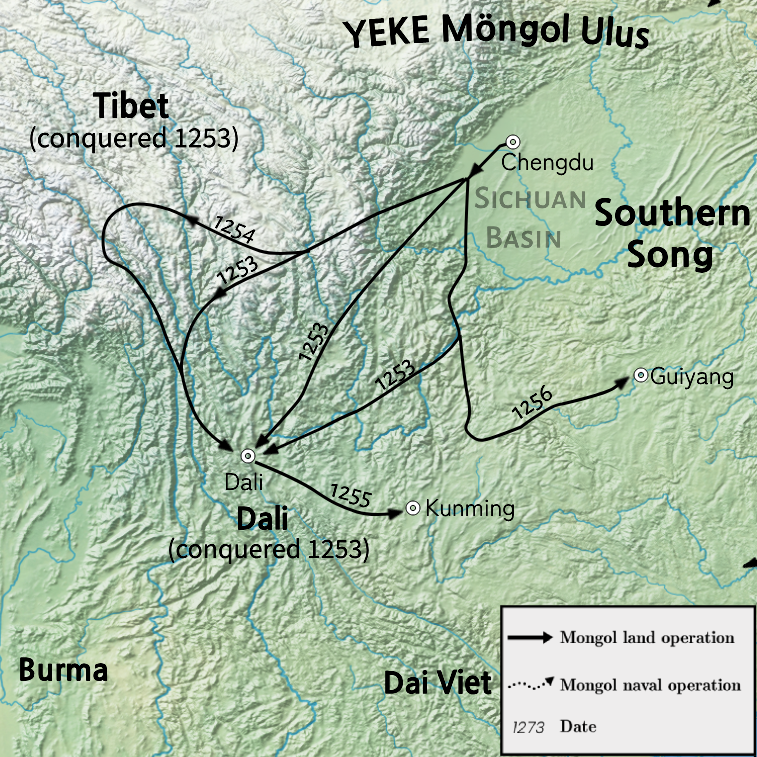
1253 Mongol conquest of Dali Kingdom

Möngke Khan dispatched Kublai to the Dali Kingdom in 1253 to outflank the Song. The Gao family dominated the court, resisted and murdered Mongol envoys. The Mongols divided their forces into three. One wing rode eastward into the Sichuan basin. The second column under Uryankhadai took a difficult way into the mountains of western Sichuan. Kublai himself headed south over the grasslands, meeting up with the first column. While Uryankhadai was galloping in along the lakeside from the north, Kublai took the capital city of Dali and spared the residents despite the slaying of his ambassadors. The Dali King Duan Xingzhi (段興智) himself defected to the Mongols, who used his troops to conquer the rest of Yunnan. The Mongols appointed King Duan Xingzhi as Maharajah and stationed a pacification commissioner there. After Kublai's departure, unrest broke out among the Black Jang (one of the main ethnic groups of the Dali kingdom). By 1256, Uryankhadai, the son of Subutai had completely pacified Yunnan. The Duan family were originally Han Chinese from Wuwei in Gansu.

The Duan family still ruled Dali relatively independently during the Yuan dynasty. Later, the Ming dynasty dissolved this kingdom.

The Tusi chieftains and local tribe leaders and kingdoms in Yunnan, Guizhou and Sichuan submitted to Yuan rule and were allowed to keep their titles. The Han Chinese Yang family ruling the Chiefdom of Bozhou which was recognized by the Song dynasty and Tang dynasty also received recognition by the Mongols in the Yuan dynasty and later by the Ming dynasty. The Luo clan in Shuixi led by Ahua were recognized by the Yuan emperors, as they were by the Song emperors when led by Pugui and Tang emperors when led by Apei. They descended from the Shu Han era king Huoji who helped Zhuge Liang against Meng Huo. They were also recognized by the Ming dynasty.

== Southwestern China ==
Many Tusi chiefdoms and kingdoms in southwestern China which existed before the Mongol invasions were allowed to retain their integrity as vassals of the Yuan dynasty after surrendering, including the Kingdom of Dali, the Han Chinese Yang family ruling the Chiefdom of Bozhou with its seat at the castle Hailongtun, Chiefdom of Lijiang, Chiefdom of Shuidong, Chiefdom of Sizhou, Chiefdom of Yao'an, Chiefdom of Yongning and Mu'ege. As were the Goryeo dynasty and the Kingdom of Qocho.

The Han Chinese nobles Duke Yansheng and Celestial Masters continued possessing their titles in the Yuan dynasty since the previous dynasties.

== Conquest of Southern Song ==
At first, the Mongols allied with Southern Song, as both had a common enemy in the form of Jin. However, this alliance broke down with the destruction of Jur'chen Jin in 1234. After Song forces captured the former Northern Song capitals of Luoyang, Chang'an and Kaifeng from the Mongols and the Song had killed a Mongol ambassador, the Mongols declared war on the Song. Very quickly the Mongol armies forced the Song back to the Yangtze, although the two sides would be engaged in a four-decade war until the fall of the Song in 1276. Islamic engineers joined later and especially contributed counterweight trebuchets, "Muslim phao", which had a maximum range of 300 meters compared to 150 meters of the ancient Chinese predecessor. It played a significant role in taking the Chinese strongholds and was as well used against infantry units on the battlefield.

The Mongol force which invaded south China was far greater than the force they sent to invade the Middle East in 1256.

The Mongols made heavy use of indigenous ethnic minority soldiers in southern China rather than Mongols. The Kingdom of Dali's indigenous Cuan-Bo army led by the Duan royal family were the majority of the forces in the Mongol Yuan army sent to attack Song China during battles along the Yangtze river. During a Mongol attack against the Song China, there were only 3,000 Mongol cavalry at one point under the Mongol commander Uriyangkhadai, the majority of his army were native Cuan-Bo with Duan officers.

While the Mongol forces had success against the non-Han Chinese ruled states of the Jin and Xia, conquering the Song took much more time. The Song forces were equipped with the best technology available at the time, such as an ample supply of gunpowder weapons like ancient fire lances, rockets and flamethrowers. The fierce resistance of the Song forces resulted in the Mongols having to fight the most difficult war in all of their conquests, and the Mongols required every advantage they could gain and "every military artifice known at that time" in order to win. They looked to peoples they already conquered to acquire various military advantages. However, intrigues at the Song court would favor the Mongols.

The Yuan dynasty created a "Han Army" (漢軍) out of defected Jin troops and army of defected Song troops called the "Newly Submitted Army" (新附軍). Southern Song Chinese troops who defected and surrendered to the Mongols were granted Korean women as wives by the Mongols, whom the Mongols earlier took during their invasion of Korea as war booty. The many Song Chinese troops who defected to the Mongols were given oxen, clothes and land by Kublai Khan. As prize for battlefield victories, lands sectioned off as appanages were handed by the Yuan dynasty to Chinese military officers who defected to the Mongol side. The Yuan gave Song Chinese soldiers who defected to the Mongols juntun, a type of military farmland. Chagaan (Tsagaan) and Han tumen General Zhang Rou jointly launched an attack on the Song dynasty ordered by Töregene Khatun.

After several indecisive wars, the Mongols unsuccessfully attacked the Song garrison at Diaoyu Fortress, Hechuan, when their Great Khan, Möngke, died of cholera or dysentery. However, the general responsible for this defense was not rewarded but instead was punished by the Song court. Discouraged, he defected to the Mongols and suggested to Möngke's successor, Kublai, that the key to the conquest of Song was the capture of Xiangyang, a vital Song stronghold.

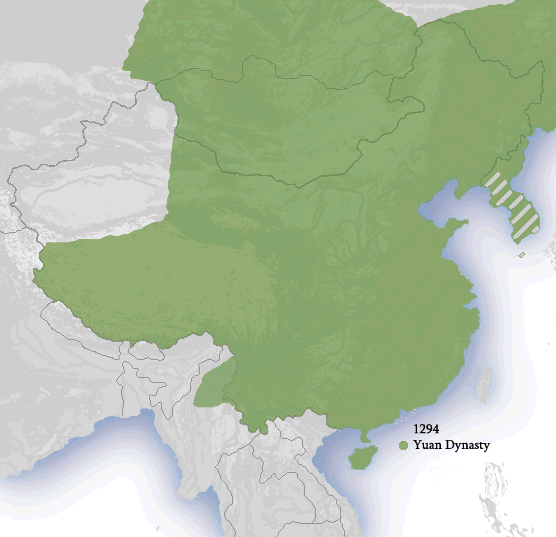
The Yuan dynasty under Kublai Khan after the conquest of Southern Song dynasty.

The Mongols quickly enclosed Xiangyang and defeated any attempt to reinforce it by the Song.

After a siege that lasted several years, and with the help of Muslim artillery created by Iraqi engineers, the Mongols finally forced the city of Xiangyang to surrender. The dying Song dynasty sent its armies against the Mongols at Yehue under the incompetent chancellor Jia Sidao. Predictably, the battle was a disaster. Running out of troops and supplies, the Song court surrendered to the Mongols in 1276.

Many Han Chinese were enslaved in the process of the Mongols invasion of China proper. According to Japanese historian Sugiyama Masaaki (杉山正明) and Funada Yoshiyuki (舩田善之), there were also a certain number of Mongolian slaves owned by Han Chinese during the Yuan dynasty. However, there is no evidence that Han Chinese, who were considered people of the bottom of Yuan society according to some researchers, suffered particularly cruel abuse.

With the desire to rule all of China, Kublai established the Yuan dynasty and became Emperor of China. However, despite the surrender of the Song court, resistance of Song remnants remained. Chinese resistance lasted for a few more years as Song loyalists organized themselves around a powerless boy emperor, brother to the last formal Song emperor. In an attempt to restore the Song dynasty, several Song officials set up a government in Guangdong, aboard ships of the vast Song navy, which still maintained over a thousand ships (which then carried the Song army, which had been forced by the Mongol army off of the land onto these Song warships). Realizing this, in 1279 Kublai sent his fleet to engage the Song fleet at the battle of Yamen in the waters off of modern Hong Kong, winning a decisive victory in which the last Song Emperor Bing of Song and his loyal officials committed suicide. This was the final major military confrontation of the Mongol conquest of the Song in southern China.

However, members of the Song Imperial Family continued to live in the Yuan dynasty like Emperor Gong of Song, Zhao Mengfu, and Zhao Yong. Zhao Mengfu painted at the Yuan court and was personally interviewed by Kublai Khan. This practice was referred to as 二王三恪, "Two Kings and Three Ke's."

Historian Patricia Buckley Ebrey noted that the Mongol Yuan dynasty treated the ethnically Jurchen Wanyan royal family of the Jin Dynasty harshly, totally butchering them by the hundreds along with the Tangut emperor of Western Xia when they defeated him earlier. However, Ebrey notes that the Mongols were totally lenient with the Han Chinese Zhao royal family of the Southern Song, unlike the Jurchens treatment of the Northern Song in the Jingkang incident. The Mongol armies spared the Southern Song royalty in the capital of Hangzhou, like Emperor Gong of Song and his mother. Without sacking the city, they spared the civilians inside, allowing them to go about their normal business, and rehired Southern Song officials. The Mongols did not take the southern Song palace women for themselves but instead had Han Chinese artisans in Shangdu marry the palace women. The Mongol emperor Kublai Khan even granted a Mongol princess from his own Borjigin family as a wife to the surrendered Han Chinese Southern Song Emperor Gong of Song and they fathered a son together named Zhao Wanpu.

== Chinese resistance in Vietnam against the Mongols ==
The ancestors of the Trần clan originated from the province of Fujian and later migrated to Đại Việt under Trần Kinh (陳京 Chén Jīng), the ancestor of the Trần clan. Their descendants, the later rulers of Đại Việt who were of mixed-blooded descent later established the Trần dynasty, which ruled Vietnam (Đại Việt). Despite many intermarriages between the Trần and several members of the Lý dynasty alongside members of their imperial court as in the case of Trần Lý and Trần Thừa, some of the mixed-blooded descendants of the Trần dynasty and certain members of the clan were still capable of speaking Chinese such as when a Yuan dynasty envoy had a meeting with the Chinese-speaking Trần prince Trần Quốc Tuấn in 1282.

Professor Liam Kelley noted that people from Song dynasty China like Zhao Zhong and Xu Zongdao fled to Tran dynasty ruled Vietnam after the Mongol invasion of the Song and they helped the Tran fight against the Mongol invasion. The ancestors of the Tran clan originated from the modern day province of Fujian as did the Daoist cleric Xu Zongdao who recorded the Mongol invasion and referred to them as "Northern bandits". He quoted the Đại Việt Sử Ký Toàn Thư which said "When the Song [Dynasty] was lost, its people came to us. Nhật Duật took them in. There was Zhao Zhong who served as his personal guard. Therefore, among the accomplishments in defeating the Yuan [i.e., Mongols], Nhật Duật had the most." The Tran defeated the Mongol invasions of Vietnam.

Southern Song Chinese military officers and civilian officials left to overseas countries, went to Vietnam and intermarried with the Vietnamese ruling elite and went to Champa to serve the government there as recorded by Zheng Sixiao. Southern Song soldiers were part of the Vietnamese army prepared by emperor Trần Thánh Tông against the second Mongol invasion.

== Tactics and policies ==
During their campaigns, the Mongol Empire recruited many nationalities in their warfare, such as those of Central and East Asia. The Mongols employed Chinese troops, especially those who worked catapults and gunpowder to assist them in other conquests. In addition to Chinese troops, many scholars and doctors from China accompanied Mongol commanders to the west. The Mongols valued people with specialized skills.

The ability to make cast iron which was tough enough for shooting objects with gunpowder was available to the Chinese in the Song dynasty and it was adopted by the Liao, Jin, and Yuan dynasties.

During the invasion of Transoxiana in 1219, along with the main Mongol force, Genghis Khan used a Chinese specialist catapult unit in battle. They were used in Transoxania again in 1220. The Chinese may have used the catapults to hurl gunpowder bombs, since they already had them by this time (although there were other siege engineers and technologies used in the campaigns, too.) While Genghis Khan was conquering Transoxania and Central Asia, several Chinese who were familiar with gunpowder were serving with Genghis's army. "Whole regiments" entirely made out of Chinese were used by the Mongols to command bomb hurling trebuchets during the invasion of Iran. Historians have suggested that the Mongol invasion had brought Chinese gunpowder weapons to Central Asia. One of these was the huochong, a Chinese mortar. Books written around the area afterward depicted the use of gunpowder weapons which resembled that of China.

One thousand northern Chinese engineer squads accompanied the Mongol Hulagu Khan during his conquest of the Middle East. 1,000 Chinese participated in the Siege of Baghdad (1258). The Chinese General Guo Kan was one of the commanders during the siege and appointed Governor of Baghdad after the city was taken.

While serving in the Mongol armies, Chinese generals were able to observe the invasion of West Asia.

According to Ata-Malik Juvayni during the assault on the Alamut Assassins fort, "Khitayan" built siege weapons resembling crossbows were used. "Khitayan" meant Chinese and it was a type of arcuballista, deployed in 1256 under Hulagu's command. Stones were knocked off the castle and the bolts "burnt" a great number of the Assassins. They could fire a distance around 2,500 paces. The device was described as an ox's bow. Pitch which was lit on fire was applied to the bolts of the weapon before firing. Another historian thinks that instead gunpowder might have been strapped onto the bolts which caused the burns during the battle recorded by Juvayini.

Alans were recruited into the Mongol forces with one unit called "Right Alan Guard" which was combined with "recently surrendered" soldiers, Mongols, and Chinese soldiers stationed in the area of the former Kingdom of Qocho and in Besh Balikh the Mongols established a Chinese military colony led by Chinese general Qi Kongzhi (Ch'i Kung-chih).

Against the Alans and the Cumans (Kipchaks), the Mongols used divide and conquer tactics: first the Mongols told the Cumans to stop allying with the Alans and then, after the Cumans followed their suggestion, the Mongols defeated the Alans and then attacked the Cumans. Alan and Kipchak guards were used by Kublai Khan. In 1368 at the end of the Yuan dynasty in China Toghan Temür was accompanied by his faithful Alan guards. "Mangu enlisted in his bodyguard half the troops of the Alan prince, Arslan, whose younger son Nicholas took a part in the expedition of the Mongols against Karajang (Yunnan). This Alan imperial guard was still in existence in 1272, 1286 and 1309, and it was divided into two corps with headquarters in the Ling pei province (Karakorúm)." Alans were converted to Roman Catholic Christianity as were Armenians in China by John of Montecorvino.

=== Siege strategy ===
James Waterson cautioned against attributing the population drop in northern China to Mongol slaughter since much of the population may have moved to southern China under the Southern Song or died of disease and famine as agricultural and urban city infrastructure were destroyed. The Mongols spared cities from massacre and sacking if they surrendered, like Kaifeng which was surrendered to Subetai by Xu Li, Yangzhou, which was surrendered to Bayan by Li Tingzhi's second in command after Li Tingzhi was executed by the Southern Song, and Hangzhou, which was spared from sacking when it surrendered to Kublai Khan. Han Chinese and Khitan soldiers defected en masse to Genghis Khan against the Jurchen Jin dynasty. Towns which surrendered were spared from sacking and massacre by Kublai Khan. The Khitan reluctantly left their homeland in Manchuria as the Jin moved their primary capital from Beijing south to Kaifeng and defected to the Mongols.

== See also ==
- Conquest dynasty
- Mongol conquest of the Qara Khitai
- Mongol invasions of Tibet
- Slave trade in the Mongol Empire
