= Mongol invasions of Sakhalin =

- Part of Mongol campaigns in Siberia
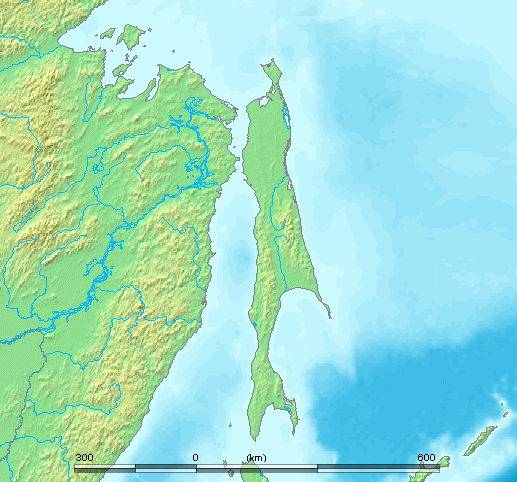
- Sakhalin and its surroundings
Date	1264–1308
Location	Sakhalin, mainland of Outer Manchuria, and Strait of Tartary
Result	Mongol victory; Ainu incursions against the Nivkh repulsed, Ainu people in Sakhalin become tributaries of the Yuan dynasty

Belligerents
Mongol Empire (Yuan dynasty); Nivkh people	Sakhalin Ainu

Commanders and leaders
Taxiala; Tata'erdai; Yangwuludai; Others	Waying; Yushannu; Others

From 1264 to 1308, the Mongol Empire (and its successor the Yuan dynasty) made several incursions into the island of Sakhalin off the east coast of Siberia to aid their Nivkh allies against the Ainu, who had been expanding north from Hokkaido. The Ainu put up a tenacious resistance, even launching a counter-attack on Mongol positions on the continent across the Strait of Tartary in 1297, but finally capitulated to the successive Yuan dynasty in 1308.

== Background ==
=== The peoples of Sakhalin ===
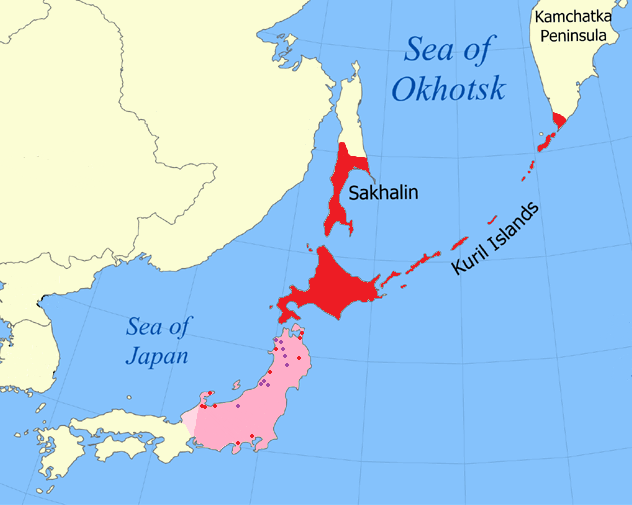
Historical extent of the Ainu people

The Nivkh are believed to be the descendants of an indigenous population that has inhabited Sakhalin since the Neolithic. During the 6th century, a confluence of Koryak culture from the north, the Heishui Mohe culture from the west, and indigenous Neolithic Sakhalin culture gave birth to the Okhotsk culture, which was characterized by fishing, sea mammal hunting, pig breeding, and pottery. This culture expanded rapidly in the 7th century from Sakhalin: to the north, it took over the Kuril Islands and reached as far as the southern tip of the Kamchatka Peninsula; to the south, it crossed the La Pérouse Strait and met the Satsumon culture on the northern shores of Hokkaido.

The Nivkh, the dominant population of Sakhalin before the 12th century, are believed to have been the bearers of Okhotsk culture. The Nivkh are known in Chinese sources as "Jiliemi" (吉列迷; Middle Chinese: /kiɪt̚ liᴇt̚ mei/), which became Russified as "Gilyak" in the modern era and later renamed to the endonym "Nivkh" in the 1930s.

As a result of the northward expansion of the Yamato people in Honshu beginning in the 7th century, the Emishi were slowly assimilated into the dominant Japanese culture or pushed further north to the island of Hokkaido. The influx of migrants from Honshu to Hokkaido gave rise to the Satsumon culture in Hokkaido, which spread agriculture throughout the island, save for the coast of the Sea of Okhotsk facing Sakhalin, which remained under the influence of the Okhotsk. Eventually, population pressure and the need for agricultural land drove the Satsumon, identified as ancestors of the Ainu, into warfare with the Okhotsk in the 10th to 11th centuries, prompting the Okhotsk to retreat to Sakhalin. The conflicts of the period were reflected in the yukar oral traditions of the northern Hokkaido Ainu, in which the heroes of the "land people" (yaunkur) prevailed over the "sea people" (repunkur).

The proto-Ainu Satsumon followed up with an invasion of southern Sakhalin in the 11th to 12th century, leaving oral traditions recounting how the Ainu defeated the Tonchi people there (likely the Okhotsk) and drove them north by boat. Thus, the people who came to be known as the Ainu settled in southern Sakhalin, while the Nivkhs remained in northern Sakhalin and the area around the Amur Liman on the mainland.

=== Mongol interest in Northeast Asia ===
As part of the Mongol conquests of the Jurchen Jin dynasty and the Eastern Xia, the Mongols took political control of Manchuria in 1233. In response to raids by the Nivkh and the Udege, the Mongols established an administration post at Nurgan (now Tyr, Russia) at the junction of the Amur and Amgun in 1263, and forced the submission of the two peoples. The Mongols were motivated by their worldview that heaven had bestowed them the right to rule the whole world, thus unconquered people were naturally rebels upon whom military conquest was justified. The Mongols were also in the process of incorporating the Chinese tributary system for their own political and commercial purposes: the Mongols could manage relations with the peripheral peoples of Northeast Asia while making sure that goods from the region would be available as tribute or trade goods. Sable furs from lower Amur and Sakhalin, for instance, were especially favoured by the Mongol-Chinese upper class at the time. From the Nivkh perspective, their surrender to the Mongols essentially established a military alliance against the Ainu who had invaded their lands.

In addition, some Japanese researchers ascribe another motivation to the Mongols for their subjugation of Sakhalin. Calling the Sakhalin expeditions a "Mongol invasion from the north" (北からの蒙古襲来), proponents of the northern invasion theory connect the events in Sakhalin with the contemporaneous Mongol invasions of Japan in the south. They theorize that the Mongols were interested in a northern route into Japan through Manchuria and Sakhalin. Presumably, the Mongols would sail south from Sakhalin to Yezo (now Hokkaido), and invade Honshu from there. However, there are no historical records or maps of the period that reveal a geographic knowledge that Sakhalin was anywhere near Japan, so any intention on the part of the Mongols to use Sakhalin as an entry point into Japan remains doubtful.

== Conflicts ==
=== Expeditions into Sakhalin (1264–1286) ===
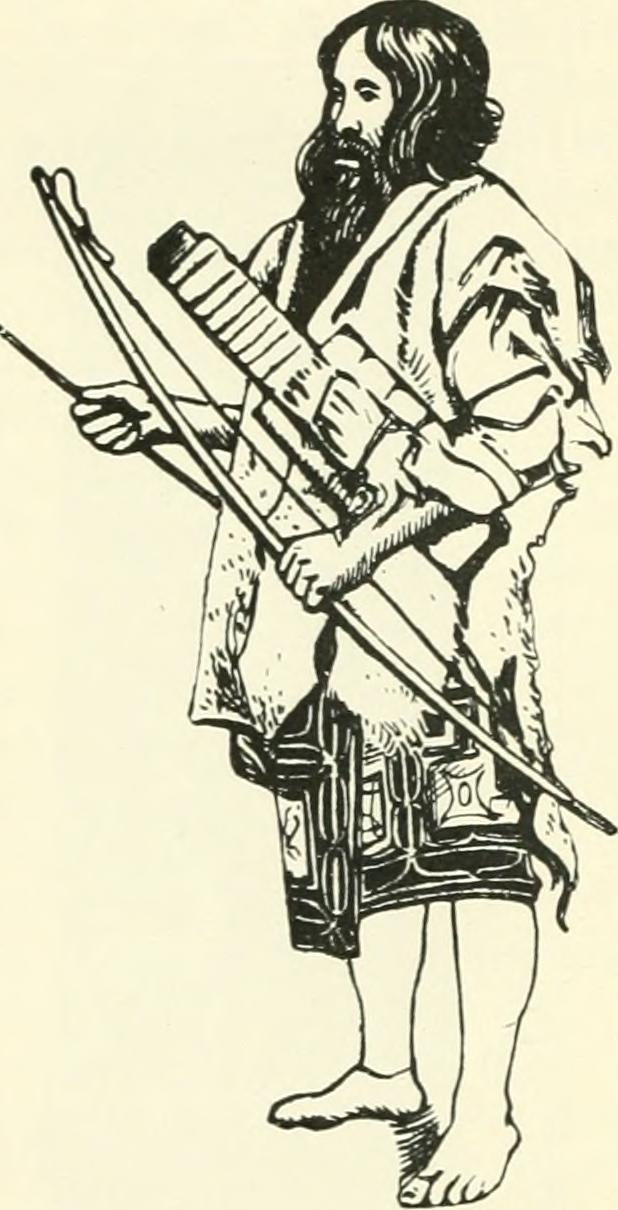
Ainu man with bow and arrow. The Ainu were noted to have used wooden bows and poisoned arrows in Chinese accounts.

Soon after receiving the surrender of the Nivkh, the Mongols received reports of the Nivkh being invaded yearly by the peoples of the east, namely the Guwei (骨嵬) and the Yiliyu (亦里于). "Guwei" was the name that the Nivkh used to refer to the Ainu people, while "Yiliyu", which means "deer" in Tungusic languages, could refer to any of the Tungusic peoples like the ancestors of the Sakhalin Uilta. The Mongols attacked the Ainu on Sakhalin on 30 November 1264, but the Ainu returned the next year to attack the Nivkh, killing some of their warriors. This time, however, the Mongols only sent supplies of food and weapons.

Following the formal establishment of the Mongol-led Yuan dynasty in 1271, Taxiala (塔匣剌) of the Mongol eastern expedition army attempted to invade Sakhalin in 1272 and 1273, but he was not able to cross the raging Strait of Tartary. Seeking the advice of the local Udege people around Nurgan, Taxiala was told that he must wait for the strait to freeze in the winter months, then he could march his army across the ice into Sakhalin where he would find the lands of the Nivkh and the Ainu. This was certainly possible since the strait was only about four miles wide at its narrowest point, and the Ainu and Nivkh had long made use of this fact. Armed with this knowledge, Taxiala petitioned the Yuan court for another expedition against the Ainu in 1273, but this was rejected. However, the Mongols appeared to have learned the lesson, as subsequent Mongol expeditions into Sakhalin all happened during winter months.

The next record of an invasion on the Ainu was in 1282, when Jurchens under Mongol rule were sent to aid the war effort by making boats to ship supplies across the sea. In 1284, a Mongol expedition was postponed from September to November out of fears that the windy seas might topple the supply boats. Following that campaign, the Mongols sent large armies up to 10,000 men for the expeditions of 1285 and 1286. Led by Tata'erdai (塔塔兒帶) and Yangwuludai (楊兀魯帶), the expeditions sailed across the sea in 1000 small boats carrying 10 men each. Judging by the relatively small population of the Sakhalin Ainu in later centuries, it is unlikely that the Ainu could have mustered a force large enough to defeat the Mongols with such numbers in open combat. The Mongol armies apparently reached the southern tip of Sakhalin at this time, since ramparts of a Mongol-Chinese fort dated to the 13th century were discovered at Cape Crillon. The ramparts, called the Shiranushi earthwork (白主土城) by Japanese archaeologists, were markedly different from Ainu chashi and is the only fortification of a continental type found on Sakhalin. Japanese researcher Kazuyuki Nakamura believes that the Shiranushi site should be identified as the Guohuo fort (果夥) mentioned in the Yuan source Jingshi Dadian (經世大典, "Compendium for governing the world"), and that it was built by the Mongols to repel attempts by Hokkaido Ainu to dislodge them.

=== The Ainu counterattack and the end of the conflict (1287–1308) ===
To support the continual campaigns into Sakhalin, the Mongols established military-agricultural colonies near the Amur estuary around 1285, populating them with Han Chinese exiles of the newly extinguished Song dynasty. This did not last long, however, as the rebellion of the Mongol prince Nayan in Manchuria forced the troops to withdraw from the Amur region in 1287. Perhaps reflecting the diminishing Mongol influence in the area, two Nivkh who had been centurions (百戶) in the Mongol military defected to the Ainu in 1296, and the next year an Ainu force under the chieftain Waying (瓦英) crossed the strait on Nivkh boats and raided settlements on the continent. The Nivkh that were still aligned with the Mongols warned that the Ainu planned to cross the sea from Guohuo when the sea freezes, and that they were going to attack the falconers of the Amur estuary. These falconers, which included some Nivkh, were targeted by Ainu raiders for their falcons—the feathers were an exotic trade good—and for their supplies from China due to their status as slaves of the Mongol imperial court. Thus warned, when the Ainu invaded the Amur estuary in mid-1297, the Mongols caught up with them and defeated the invading Ainu near Lake Kizi.

The Ainu were recorded to have made one more raid on the continent in 1305, which evaded the Mongol army. In 1308, the Ainu chieftains Waying and Yushannu (玉善奴) communicated through the Nivkh that they desired to surrender. The Ainu sent an ambassador to Nurgan with gifts of swords and armours and promised to pay a tribute of furs every year. With this, the war between the Ainu and the Mongols was over.

== Aftermath ==
The Mongol invasions represented the first time the influence of a regime based in China was directly extended to Sakhalin. Even before the end of hostilities, the Ainu and the peoples of the Amur region had been secretly trading valuable furs with the connivance of the Mongol officials in Nurgan. Soon after the subjugation of the Ainu, Ainu elders made tributary visits to Yuan posts located at Wuliehe (兀列河; in the Tym basin), Nanghar (囊哈兒; near present-day Langry), and Boluohe (波羅河; the Poronay), and received gifts in return, making presenting tribute a form of trade. The center of the northern trade gradually shifted to Chinese posts in the Amur Estuary and on Sakhalin following the Mongol conquests, and Sakhalin itself became a conduit of trade between the Mongol Empire in mainland Eurasia and the Japanese archipelago. The Mongols retreated from Sakhalin after 1320, and tributary trade in Sakhalin and the Amur basin ceased in the mid 14th century as the Yuan dynasty fell into decline. The Chinese under the Ming dynasty re-established a presence in the area in 1409 and collected tribute from the Nivkh and the Ainu until late 15th century. Regardless of the political situation, a network of trade linking Manchuria, Japan, and Kamchatka with Sakhalin at the center persisted until the 18th century.

The Mongol peace put a stop to the conflicts between the Nivkh and the Ainu, with the Ainu keeping to southern Sakhalin, leaving the north to the Nivkh. Hostility gave way to a relationship characterized by intermarriage, commercial trade, and cultural exchanges between the two peoples. A number of important cultural elements that became the hallmarks of modern Ainu culture, including the iomante bear ceremony, were introduced to the Ainu from the Okhotsk culture carried by Nivkh as a result. For the Nivkh, the increasing focus on trade led to the rise of the ethnographic Nivkh culture at the expense of the original Okhotsk culture: while rituals involving orcas and bears remained, other cultural characteristics like pottery disappeared.

The peace between the Nivkh and the Sakhalin Ainu as well as the Mongol presence in Sakhalin also meant that the Hokkaido Ainu could not freely migrate to Sakhalin across the La Pérouse Strait as they had done over the centuries. The population pressure that pushed the Ainu north now encountered resistance, and the resulting reaction in the southern direction brought the Ainu into increasing conflict with the Japanese. Around the time of the Mongol invasions of Sakhalin, the Ainu of Tsugaru rose up against the powerful Andō clan (安東氏) of northern Japan in a war that lasted from 1268 to 1328 called the Ezo Rebellion (蝦夷大乱). The war, which was described by the 13th century Japanese Buddhist monk Nichiren as a disaster on par with the Mongol invasion of Japan in 1274 and 1281, caused the Andō clan to splinter and might even have contributed to the fall of the ruling Kamakura shogunate in Japan. Despite the commonly accepted cause of the war being trade disagreements and religious differences between the Ainu and the Andō clan, Mongol action in Sakhalin might have had a hand in creating and amplifying the conflict. The so-called "Mongol invasion of Japan from the north" was therefore an indirect one at most, in the opinion of Kazuyuki Nakamura.
