= Invasion of Sakhalin =

Invasion of Sakhalin may refer to:

- Mongol invasions of Sakhalin (1264–1308), during the period of the Mongol Empire
- Japanese invasion of Sakhalin (1905), during the Russo-Japanese War
- Soviet invasion of South Sakhalin (1945), during World War II
