= Liaohe Plain =

Paddy plain in eastern China

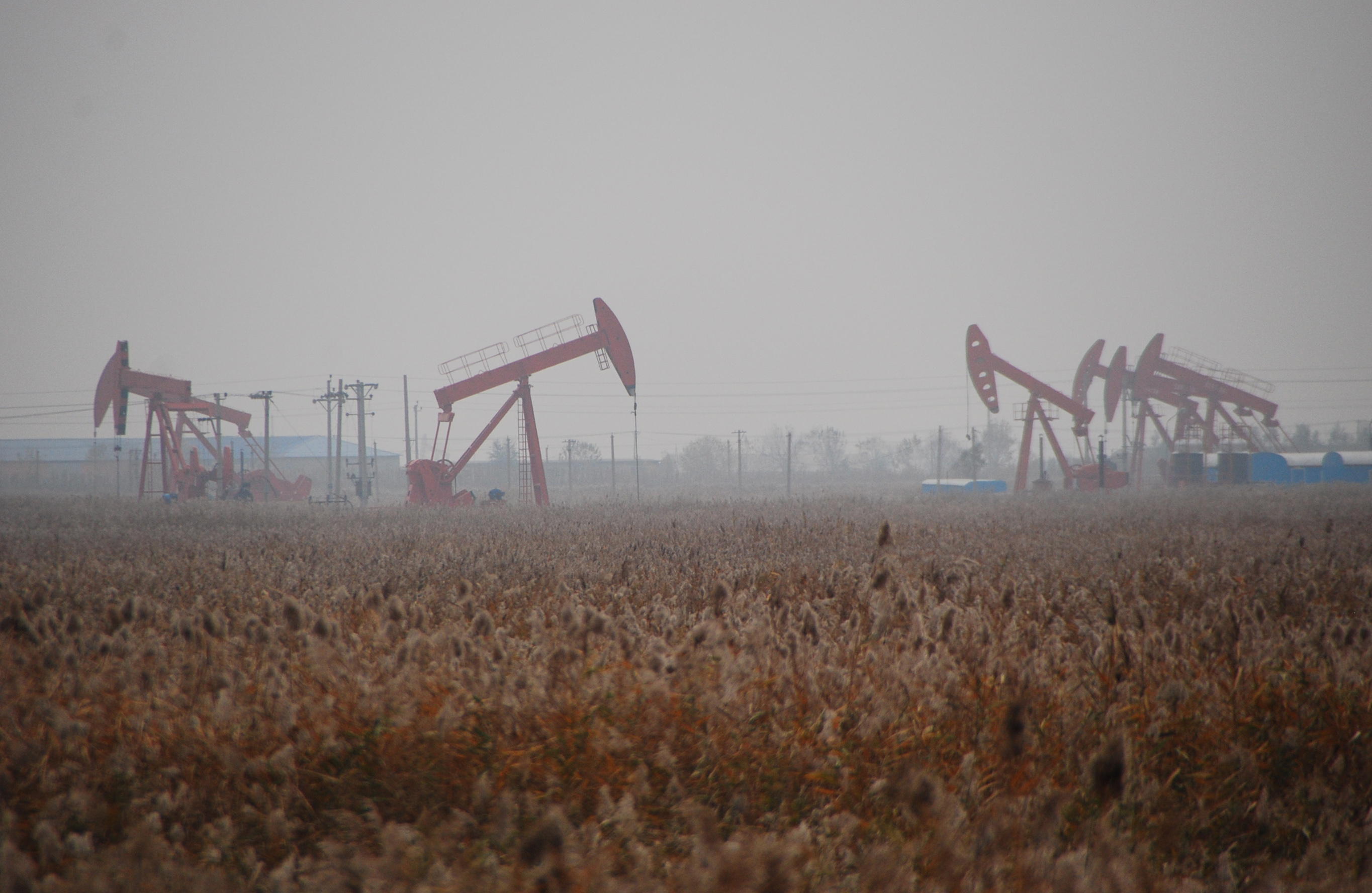
Liaohe oil field in Panjin, Liaoning, China

The Liaohe Plain is a paddy plain located in the southern tip of Northeast China, part of the greater Northeast China Plain. The Liaohe Plain is one of the most important industrial zones in Liaoning, and with a cultivated land area of 144 million hectares, the area of the paddy-growing fields of its rice field station has increased by 977.1 sq km, from 1988 to 2006.

== Location ==
Liaohe is located in China's golden belt of maize production, and serves as a strategic commodity grain base. Liaohe's average annual temperatures in January and July are −9.8 to 8.6 °C and 24.4 °C, with irrigation generally starting in early May. Cultivation activity includes oil and gas exploration, aquaculture, and salt production. Excessive land usage contributes to the deformation of the plain, detrimental to the environment and economic construction projects.

The adjacent Liaohe River Basin is one of the most vulnerable areas to climate change in China and is also important to grain production in Inner Mongolia.

== See also ==
- Geography of China
- Mongolian–Manchurian grassland
- Agriculture in China
- Environmental degradation
