= Cape Crillon =

Cape in Sakhalin Oblast, Russia

Cape Crillon Мыс Крильон
- Cape
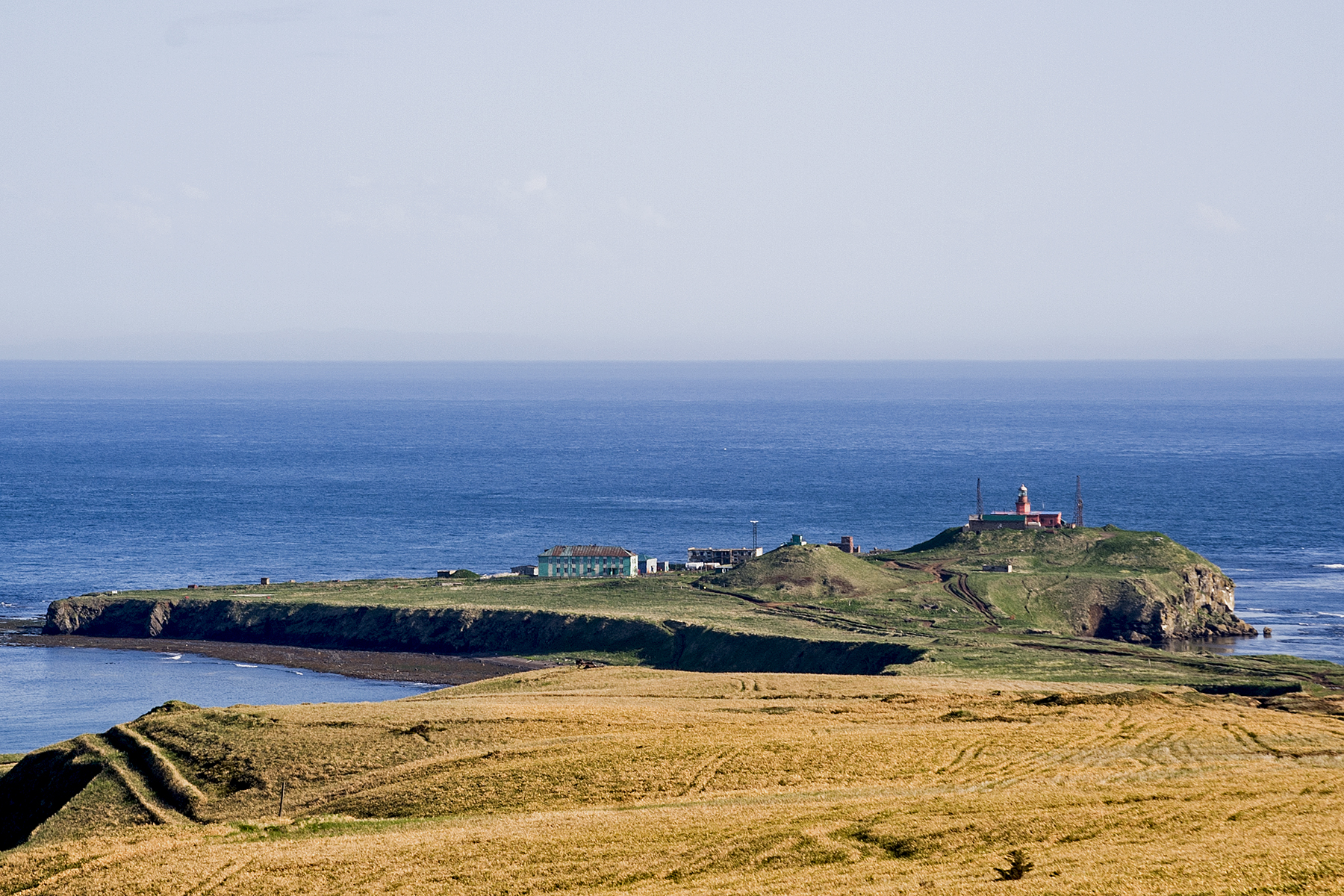
- Extremity of the cape

- Location within Russia
- Coordinates: 45°54′00″N 142°05′00″E
- Location: Sakhalin Oblast, Russian Far East Russia
- Water bodies: Pacific Ocean

Cape Crillon (Russian: Мыс Крильон), known as Cape Nishinotoro (西能登呂岬, Nishinotoro-misaki) in Japan, is the southernmost point of Sakhalin. The cape was named by Frenchman Jean-François de La Pérouse, who was the first European to discover it. Cape Sōya, in Japan, is located 43 kilometres (27 mi) to the south, across La Pérouse Strait.

== Overview ==
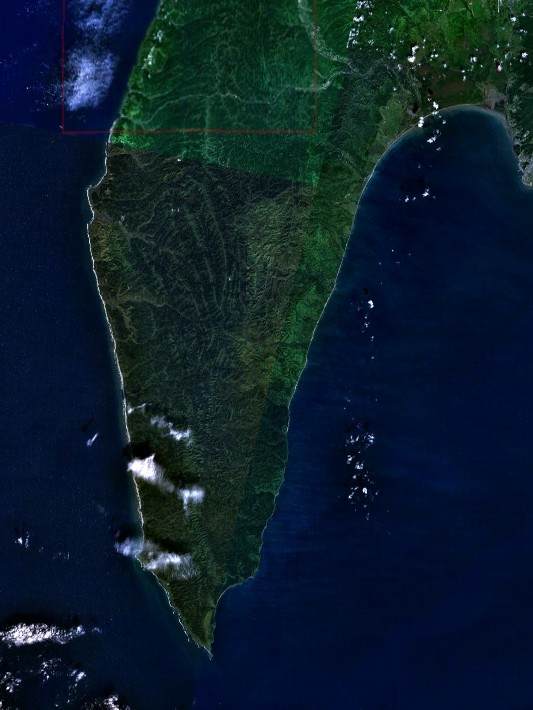
Crillon Peninsula and Cape Crillon (southern section)

A Russian weather station, a lighthouse and a military base are all situated at Cape Crillon today. Additionally, the cape is the Russian terminus of the proposed Sakhalin–Hokkaido Tunnel that would connect Japan and Russia by rail.

On the western coast of the cape is the rock formation formerly known in Japanese as Kinfugan (金敷岩, literally "Anvil Rock").

== History ==
In 1808, Mamiya Rinzō was dispatched by the Tokugawa shogunate to survey Japanese territory on Sakhalin. Having arrived at the Matsumae domain outpost of Shiranushi on the southern tip of Cape Crillon, he was directed by local Ainu to a place called Kogohau (コゞハウ) where the remains of rammed earth walls were found.

By the early 20th century, the ruins had come to be known as the Shiranushi Earthen Castle. In 1905, there were discovered Matsumae documents suggesting the castle had been built by Imai Kanehira.

Current archaeological evidence indicates the castle was a colonial product of the Yuan dynasty. According to the Yuanshi, the general Yangwuludai (楊兀魯帶) crossed the sea and built the castle of Guohuo (果夥城) on Sakhalin.

== See also ==
- Cape Elizabeth (Sakhalin)
- Mongol invasions of Sakhalin
