= Puxian Wannu =

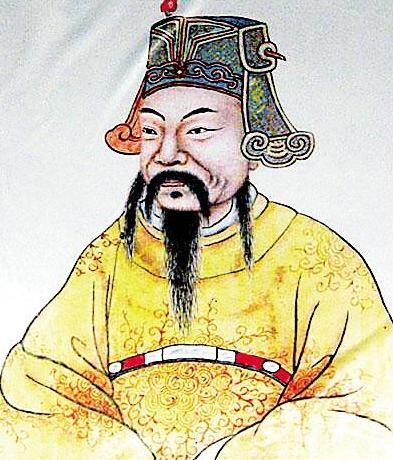
Illustration of Puxian Wannu

Púxiān Wànnú (simplified Chinese: 蒲鲜万奴; traditional Chinese: 蒲鮮萬奴; Wade–Giles: P'u-hsien Wan-nu) was a Jurchen warlord who established the short-lived Eastern Xia dynasty in 13th-century China.

In his early career he served in the Jin (金) as Director of the Shangjiu Bureau (尚厩局), overseeing horse administration. For his military merits, he was appointed as Pacification Commissioner of Liaodong (遼東宣撫使), entrusted with the defense of the region.

In 1211 the Jin army was defeated by the southward Mongol forces at Yehu Ridge (野狐嶺), and in 1215 Zhongdu fell, the situation of the Jin state deteriorating sharply. Wannu then seized the chance to declare independence in Liaodong, founding a state called Great Zhen (大真) and taking the title of Heavenly King (天王). Later he declared himself emperor, changed the state name to Xia (夏), also known as Eastern Xia (東夏), and fought against the Khitan, the Mongols, Goryeo, and Jurchen groups that remained loyal to Jin.

In 1233, during the Mongol campaign against Goryeo, Prince Güyük led a large army that took five Eastern Xia capitals in succession. Puxian Wannu was captured while fleeing and was executed on the spot.

Púxiān Wànnú is also mentioned under the name fūjīū tāīīshī (Persian: فوجیو تاییشی) in Persian historical sources such as the Jami' al-tawarikh.

== Early life ==
Puxian Wannu was a Jurchen from Xianping in the Jin. In his early career he served as Director of the Shangjiu Bureau (尚厩局), in charge of the court and the army's horses. He oversaw the breeding, training, and supply of the stables, and during campaigns he was responsible for the allocation and deployment of warhorses.

In 1206 he served as deputy to Grand Commander Wanyan Saibu (完顏賽不) and joined the Jin invasion of the Song dynasty. In the Zhenshui region, the Jin army encountered a Song force sent to block their advance. After discussion, Saibu and the other generals attacked head on, while Puxian Wannu led his troops around to strike from the rear. When the Song lines collapsed and began to fall back, he launched his assault, cutting down large numbers of retreating soldiers. In that battle some twenty thousand Song troops were killed, several thousand horses and livestock were captured, along with a great quantity of weapons and armor. For this success, the ruler of Jin, Wanyan Jing (完顏璟), promoted him to Pacification Commissioner of Xianping (咸平招討使) and sent him to Liaodong (遼東, today's eastern Liaoning).

In 1211 Genghis Khan led a massive army south, declaring war on Jin. As the Mongol forces advanced toward Zhongdu (中都), they clashed with Jin troops at Yehu Ridge (野狐嶺). The Mongol commanders pressed their attack, slaughtered the blocking forces, and routed the Jin army. On hearing of the disaster, the ruler of Jin was shaken, fled in haste, and moved his capital to Kaifeng. Puxian Wannu also took part in the campaign, but after the defeat he withdrew to Xianping. The Mongol victory severed the link between the northeast and the central regions, leaving the Jin state effectively cut in two.

After the move to Kaifeng, the situation in the northeast grew increasingly unstable. Local Khitan groups rose in rebellion, with Yelü Liuge (耶律留哥), Yelü Hanshe (耶律喊舍), Yelü Jinshan (耶律金山), Yelü Sibu (耶律厮不) and others proclaiming the restoration of the Liao. The ruler of Jin repeatedly ordered Puxian Wannu to suppress them. He fought several campaigns, winning at times and losing at others, but was unable to bring the region under lasting control.

In 1215, with Khitan and Mongol attacks pressing constantly against the Jurchen, the crisis deepened. That same year, the Mongols captured Zhongdu, the Jin city that had once been the capital. Puxian Wannu called the Jurchen chieftains of the region to a council at Xianping. He declared that the Wanyan clan had withdrawn to Kaifeng and stood on the edge of ruin, yet continued to issue commands that bore no relation to reality. If this continued, Liaodong would be lost. He urged that they should stand on their own, and asked them to trust him, promising to lead them through the crisis.

With the support of the chieftains, Puxian Wannu declared his independence in Liaodong. He founded a new state called Great Zhen (大真), took the title of Heavenly King (天王), and proclaimed the reign title Tiantai (天泰).

== Early reign ==
In 1217 he moved from Dongjing to the Tumen River basin possibly to avoid both Mongol and Jin oppressions. He again named his kingdom Eastern Xia or Dongxia (东夏/東夏), established the capital around Yanji and called it Nanjing (南京, lit. 'Southern Capital'). His domain extended north to Laoyeling Mountains, south to Hamgyŏngnamdo in modern-day North Korea, east to the Sea of Japan and west to the Zhangguangcailing Mountains, corresponding to the borderlands of modern-day China, Russia and North Korea.

He seems to have submitted to the Mongol Empire again. In 1218 the Mongol and Eastern Xia armies jointly intruded into Goryeo to subdue the Khitan remnants. Goryeo also joined the campaign and the Khitans were exterminated. The Mongol army retreated after establishing a "sibling" relationship with Goryeo. Mongol officers with Eastern Xia delegates came to Goryeo to exact tribute.

== Late reign ==
In 1222 Puxian Wannu revolted against the Mongol Empire yet again while Genghis Khan made an expedition toward the west. Since Goryeo rejected his demand for the opening of trading posts on the border, he invaded Goryeo many times. In 1233 Ögedei's son Güyük attacked Eastern Xia with a large force and captured Puxian Wannu. Wannu was executed by beheading after his capture, and the Eastern Xia collapsed nearly immediately afterwards. With the demise of Puxian Wannu, Jurchen remnants in Manchuria surrendered resulting in almost two hundred years of Mongol rule in Manchuria thereafter. The Jin dynasty was overthrown in the next year.
