= Shiranushi =

Former Japanese settlement on Sakhalin

Shiranushi 白主
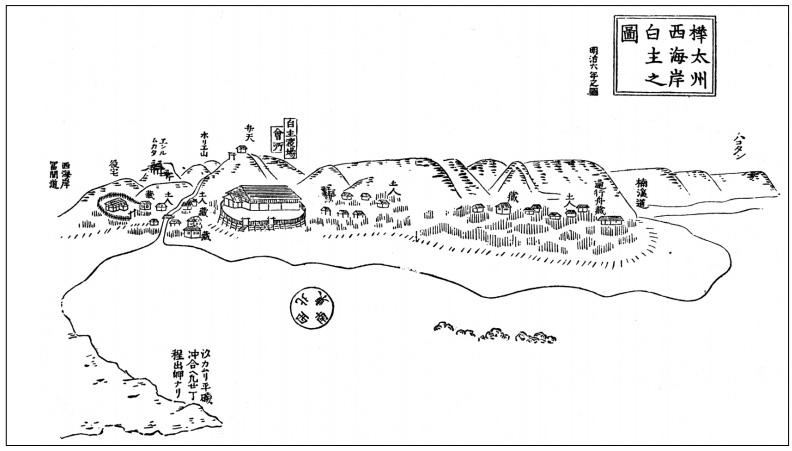
- A drawing of Shiranushi from 1873

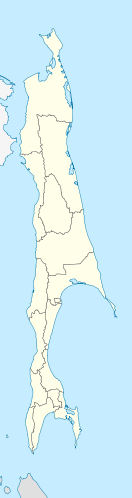
- Location within Sakhalin
- Coordinates: 45°54′45.4″N 142°03′45.1″E
- Country: Japan
- Established: 1751

Shiranushi (白主, Shiranushi) was a Japanese frontier settlement and trading post on Cape Crillon at the southernmost point of the island of Sakhalin.

The name "Shiranushi" is a Japanese transliteration of the original Ainu sirar-anusi (Ainu: シラㇻ・アヌシ, transl. 'the place where there is a cliff').

== History ==
Shiranushi was an ancient Ainu chashi site before the arrival of Japanese settlers. According to local Ainu legend, a korpokkur village had once existed there.

The Matsumae Domain had been active around Shiranushi since the 17th century. In 1636, Matsumae samurai Kōdō Shōzaemon (甲道 庄左衛門) wintered over at Shiranushi.

In 1751, the sailor Katō Kahē (加藤 嘉兵衛) founded a fishing village at Shiranushi. In 1790, the Matsumae authorities sent the samurai Takahashi Seizaemon (高橋 清左衛門) to establish an observation post on Sakhalin. Takahashi expanded the village of Shiranushi with a blockhouse and an administrative office. The settlement had a small samurai garrison.

In 1808, Mamiya Rinzō was dispatched by the Tokugawa shogunate to survey Japanese territory on Sakhalin and landed at Shiranushi.

In 1857, the Japanese government headquarters on Sakhalin was moved north to Maoka in response to the encroachment of Nikolay Rudanovsky. Declining in military and commercial importance, Shiranushi later became a ghost town.

When the entire island passed to Russian control under the 1875 Treaty of Saint Petersburg, Shiranushi was abandoned entirely. After Japan regained Southern Sakhalin under the Treaty of Portsmouth in 1905, the former site of Shiranushi was placed within the area of the Japanese village of Kōni. Today, a Japanese cemetery can still be found at Shiranushi.
