= Lake Kizi =

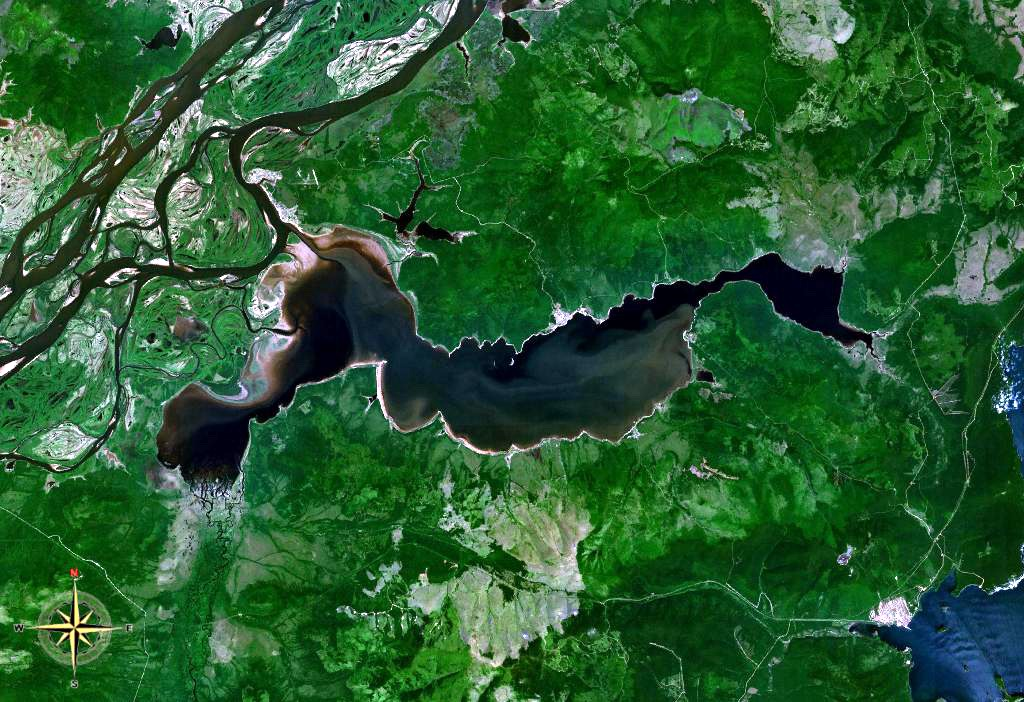
- from space

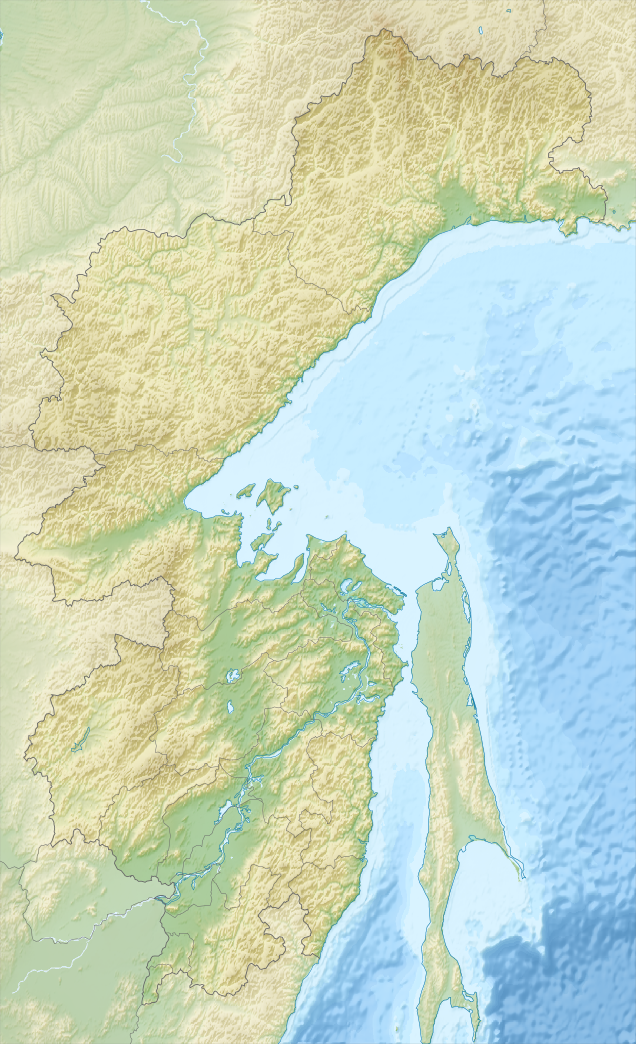
- Location within Russia Location within Khabarovsk Krai
- Location: Khabarovsk Krai
- Coordinates: 51.6°N 140.433333°E
- Type: Natural freshwater lake
- Primary inflows: Amur River
- Primary outflows: Amur River
- Basin countries: Russia
- Max. length: 41.14 km (25.56 mi)
- Max. width: 8.71 km (5.41 mi)
- Surface area: 280 km^{2} (110 sq mi)
- Max. depth: 3 m (9.8 ft) or 4 m (13 ft)
- Surface elevation: 55 m (180 ft)
- Settlements: Big Sanniki (town), Tulinskoye (village)

Lake Kizi (Russian: Кизи or Большое Кизи) is a large freshwater lake in Khabarovsk Krai, Russia. It has an area of about 280 km^{2} (108 sq mi) depending on water level and a maximum depth of 3 to 4 metres (9.8 to 13.1 ft). It lies near the right bank of the Amur River to which it is connected by the series of canals, and close to the Tatar Strait. Kizi is used for fishery.
