= Mongol conquest of Eastern Xia =

Mongol invasions against Eastern Xia, part of the Mongol conquest of China

- Part of Mongol conquest of China
Date	1217, 1222–1233
Location	Northeast China, northern Korea
Result	Destruction of Eastern Xia
Territorial changes	Territories of Eastern Xia annexed to the Mongol Empire

Belligerents
Mongol Empire	Eastern Xia

Commanders and leaders
Güyük (1233); Alchidai (1233)	Puxian Wannu (executed)

The Mongol conquest of Eastern Xia was part of the conquest of China by the Mongol Empire in the early 13th century. An initial conflict broke out in 1217 when the founder of Eastern Xia, Puxian Wannu, rebelled against the Mongol Empire. However, Wannu shortly afterward submitted to Mongol overlordship. Wannu later broke from the Mongols again, and in 1233 Ögedei Khan sent his son Güyük to conquer the kingdom. Eastern Xia was destroyed and Wannu executed.

== Background ==
Eastern Xia, also known as Dongxia or Dongzhen, was a kingdom founded by the warlord Puxian Wannu in 1215. Wannu served under the Jin dynasty during its war with the Mongol Empire. In late 1214, his army was defeated by the Eastern Liao, a vassal of the Mongols. The Jin capital, Zhongdu, fell to Muqali, and Wannu used the opportunity to establish a breakaway state, originally based in Liaoyang. After the Mongols defeated him in 1216, he sent his son Tege to the Mongols as a hostage in order to pledge his loyalty to the empire. In 1217, due to the futility of him establishing a kingdom in the area of Liaoning, he relocated to northeast Manchuria along the border with Korea.

== Conquest ==
In 1217, Wannu attempted a rebellion against his Mongol allies. This was swiftly subdued, and Wannu accepted the Mongols as his lords. In 1218, the Eastern Xia armies joined those of the Mongols in pursuit of remnants of the Khitan armies from the Later Liao dynasty which were invading Goryeo territory. Goryeo aided in these endeavors and accepted tributary status to the Mongol Empire and Eastern Xia. Wannu over the next decade raided into Goryeo numerous times. At some point after 1221, Wannu broke from the Mongols, and in 1232 the Mongol Empire requested Goryeo to attack Eastern Xia. In 1233, as part of a punitive expedition into Goryeo to force that dynasty's compliance, Ögedai sent Güyük and Alchidai to subdue Eastern Xia. The Mongol armies quickly overwhelmed Eastern Xia and Wannu was beheaded. The conquered territory was given to the youngest brother of the late Genghis Khan, Temüge.

== Aftermath ==
The Jin dynasty fell the year after, completing the Mongol conquest of North China. The empire then, in 1235, launched invasions against Korea and the Song dynasty. The conquest of all of China would not be complete until 1279 with the Battle of Yamen.
