= Eastern Xia =

1215–1233 Jurchen kingdom during the Mongol conquest

Eastern Xia 東夏
- 1215–1233
- Capital: Kaiyuan (開元), Yanji
- Common languages: Jurchen, Chinese
- Government: Monarchy
- Emperor
  - 1215–1233: Puxian Wannu
- Historical era: Post-classical history
  - Dynasty established by Puxian Wannu: 1215
  - Destroyed by Mongol Empire after rebellion: 1233
- Currency: cash coins (Dongzheng Xingbao)
Preceded by	Succeeded by
Jin dynasty	Mongol Empire
- Today part of: China; Russia

The Eastern Xia (traditional Chinese: 東夏; simplified Chinese: 东夏; pinyin: Dōng Xià), also known as Dongxia, Dongzhen (東真) or Dazhen (大真), was a short-lived kingdom established in Manchuria (including Northeast China and Outer Manchuria) by the Jurchen warlord Puxian Wannu in 1215 during the Mongol conquest of the Jin dynasty. It was eventually conquered by the Mongols and its former territories were later administered by the Liaoyang province of the Yuan dynasty.

== History ==
Puxian Wannu originally served the waning Jin dynasty under pressure from the Mongol Empire. While the Mongols under Genghis Khan invaded Jin, a Khitan chief Yelü Liuge (耶律留哥) revolted against the Jin dynasty in Liaodong in 1211 and made contact with the Mongol Empire in the next year. In 1214, the Jin dynasty dispatched Puxian Wannu to Liaodong, but he was defeated around Kaiyuan. While Mukhali of the Mongol Empire invaded Northern China and captured the Jin capital Zhongdu, Puxian Wannu rebelled against the Jin dynasty and founded the Eastern Xia dynasty in Dongjing (Liaoyang) in 1215 with the support of the Mongols. During that year, as a vassal, he sent his son Tege (帖哥/鐵哥 Tiěgē) as a hostage to the Mongols in 1216. He adopted the title of Tianwang (天王 lit. Heavenly King) and named his era Tiantai (天泰). He also established the government institutions based on the Jin systems. Although he originally acknowledged his allegiance to the Mongol Empire, he however rebelled against the Mongols and killed the Mongolian resident commissioners in 1217. He also moved the capital to Nanjing (南京 literally: "southern capital") in modern day Mopancun Fortress near Yanji, Jilin province. In 1233, Güyük (then a prince) was dispatched by Ögedei Khan to conquer the Eastern Xia. Puxian Wannu was captured and killed in the same year, which marked the official end of the Eastern Xia kingdom. The Jin dynasty was also conquered by the Mongols in the next year.

The actual name of the kingdom is controversial. Chinese documents call it Dongxia (东夏/東夏) but Goryeo almost always called it Dongzhen (東眞). Yanai Wataru insisted that Xià (夏) was a misinterpretation of Zhèn (眞). In the meanwhile Ikeuchi Hiroshi claimed that Dongzhen was an abbreviated form of Dong Nüzhen (东女眞/東女眞, Eastern Jurchen) and was just an alias.

== See also ==
- Mongol conquest of Eastern Xia
- Jin dynasty (1115–1234)
- Jurchen people
- Western Xia
