= Liaoning (disambiguation) =

Liaoning is a province of China.

Liaoning or liao ning or variation, may also refer to:

- Chinese aircraft carrier Liaoning, the first aircraft carrier of the PLA Navy
  - Type 001 aircraft carrier, the Liaoning-class aircraft carrier
- Liao ning virus
- 2503 Liaoning, main-belt asteroid
- Liaoning Whowin F.C., a Chinese football club

== See also ==
- Liao (disambiguation)
- Ning (disambiguation)
