= Khitan people =

Nomadic people who founded the Liao dynasty in China

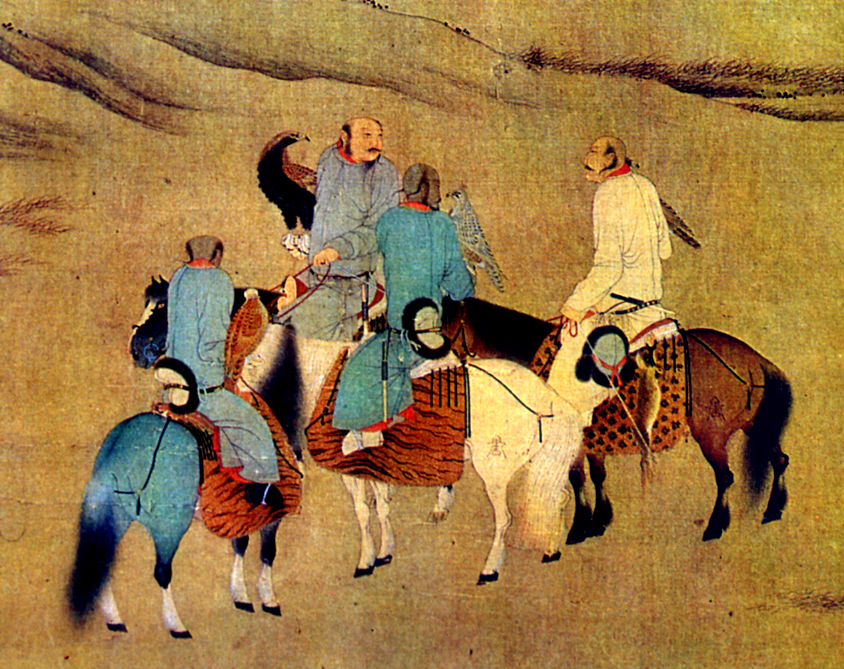
- Depiction of Khitans by Hu Gui (胡瓌, 9th/10th century), hunting with eagles

Regions with significant populations
- East Asia and North Asia

Languages
- Khitan, Middle Chinese

Religion
- Majority: Chinese Buddhism; Minorities: Shamanism, Tengriism, Christianity, Islam

Related ethnic groups
- Mongols, Daur

The Khitan people (Khitan small script: ; Chinese: 契丹; pinyin: Qìdān; Old Turkic: 𐰶𐰃𐱃𐰪, romanized: Qïtań) were a historical nomadic people from East Asia and parts of North Asia who, from the 4th century, inhabited an area corresponding to parts of modern Mongolia, Northeast China, and the Russian Far East.

As a people descended from the proto-Mongols through the Xianbei, Khitans spoke the now-extinct Khitan language, a Para-Mongolic language related to the Mongolic languages. The Khitan people founded and led the Liao dynasty (916–1125), which dominated a vast area of Siberia, Mongolia and Northern China. The Khitans of the Liao dynasty used two independent writing systems for their language: Khitan small script and Khitan large script.

After the fall of the Liao dynasty in 1125 following the Jurchen invasion, many Khitans followed Yelü Dashi's group westward to establish the Qara Khitai or Western Liao dynasty, in Central Asia, which lasted nearly a century before falling to the Mongol Empire in 1218. Other regimes founded by the Khitans included the Northern Liao, Eastern Liao, and Later Liao in China, as well as the Qutlugh-Khanid dynasty in Persia. The modern-day Daur people, a recognized minority ethnic group in Northeast China, are the genetic descendants of Khitans.

The historical European name for China, Cathay, originates from the word Khitan.

== Etymology ==
There is no consensus on the etymology of the name of Khitan. There are basically three speculations. Feng Jiasheng argues that it comes from the Yuwen chieftains' names. Zhao Zhenji thinks that the term originated from Xianbei and means "a place where Xianbei had resided". Japanese scholar Otagi Matsuo believes that Khitan's original name was "Xidan", which means "the people who are similar to the Xi people" or "the people who inhabit among the Xi people".

Deciphering the name "Khitan" that is based on a study the monuments of Khitan writing system, is associated with the concept of "cold", "chilly", "frosty" in Mongolian dialects: Khorchin, Jalayt, Durbet, Gorlos, Arukhorchin (阿鲁科尔沁), Baarin, Onnyut, Naiman — "khuten"; Kharchin, Tumut — "khiten"; Mongolian — "küyiten". In the lands of the Khitans there were a number of places whose names included the word "cold". For example, the Yinlianchuan River (陰涼川, lit.: dark and cold) is the Chinese translation of the Mongolian name of the Khuiten River (lit.: cold), which flows into the Shara Muren. Liu Xu reports that in the south of their domain lay the Lengxingshan Mountains (冷陘山), which means "cold". If we consider that the Khitan clans and tribes did not have surnames, but were known by the names of the places where they lived, it is not surprising that the name of the Khuiten River or the Lengxing Mountains could become a tribal designation.

=== China ===
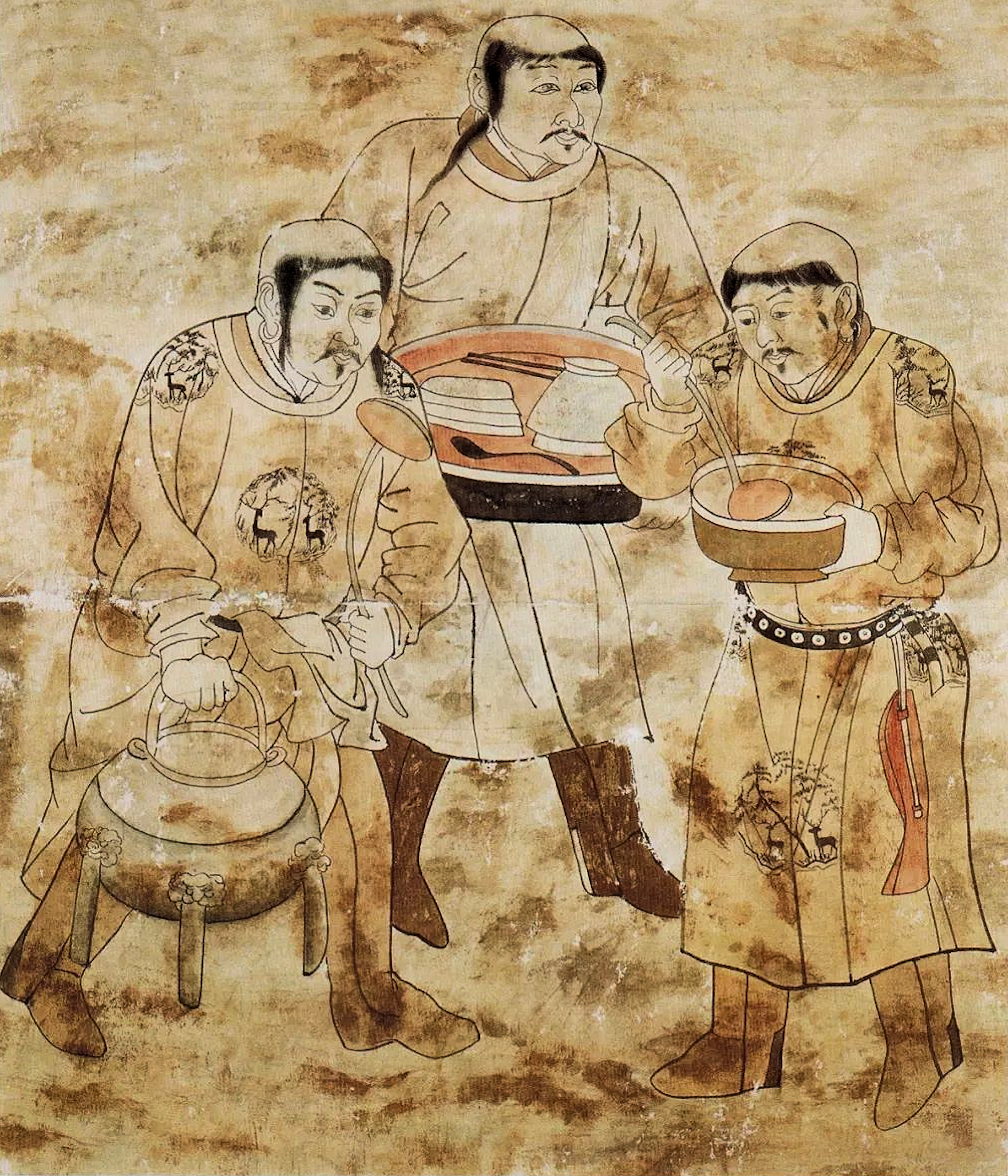
Khitans eating. Tomb mural, Chifeng, Inner Mongolia

Due to the dominance of the Khitans during the Liao dynasty in Manchuria and Mongolia and later the Qara Khitai in Central Asia where they were seen as Chinese, the term "Khitai" came to mean "China" to people near them in Central Asia, Russia and northwestern China. The name was then introduced to medieval Europe via Islamic and Russian sources, and became "Cathay". In the modern era, words related to Khitay are still used as a name for China by Mongolians, Turkic peoples, such as the Uyghurs in China's Xinjiang region and the Kazakhs of Kazakhstan and areas adjoining it, and by some Slavic peoples, such as the Russians and Bulgarians. The Han Chinese consider the ethnonym derived from Khitay as applied to them by the Uyghurs to be pejorative and the Chinese government has tried to ban its use.

== History ==
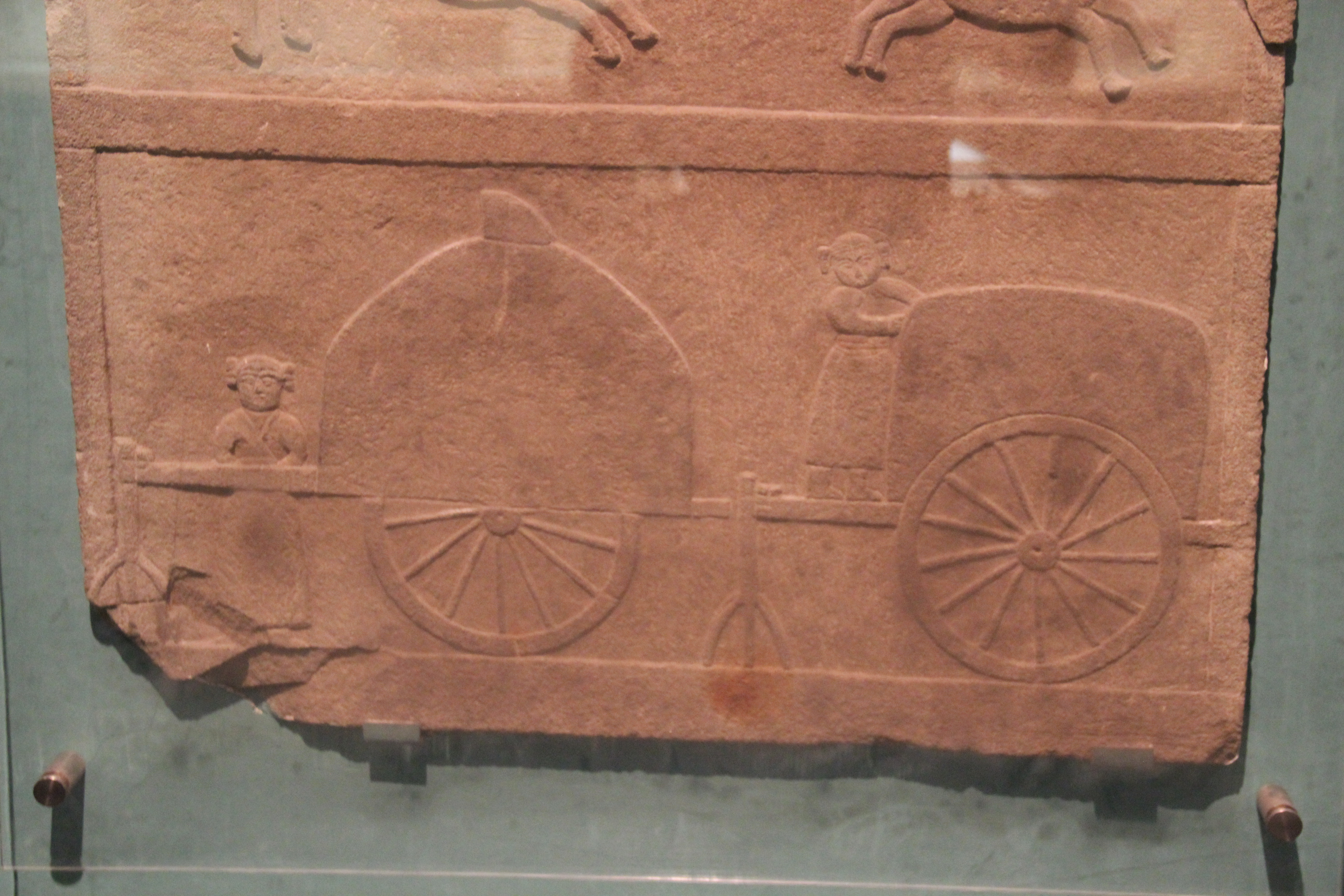
Liao dynasty tomb relief of Khitans and their baggage cart

=== Origin myth ===
According to the History of Liao compiled in the 14th century, a "sacred man" (shen-ren) on a white horse had eight sons with a "heavenly woman" (tiannü) who rode in a cart pulled by a grey ox. The man came from the Tu River (Lao Ha river in modern-day Jilin, Manchuria) and the woman from the Huang River (modern-day Xar Moron river in Inner Mongolia). The pair met where the two rivers join, and the eight sons born of their union became eight tribes.

=== Origins ===
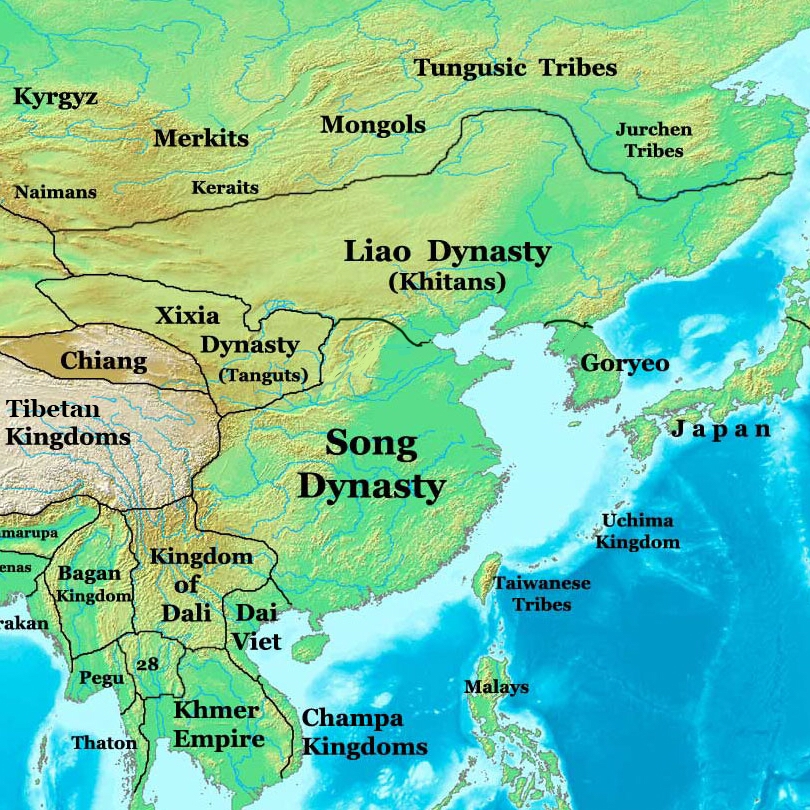
Liao dynasty in 1025

The earliest reference to a Khitan state is found in the Book of Wei, a history of the Northern Wei dynasty (386–534) that was completed in 554. Several books written after 554 mention the Khitans being active during the late third and early fourth centuries. The Book of Jin (648) mentions the Khitans in the section covering the reign of Murong Sheng (398–401). The Samguk Sagi (1145) mentions a Khitan raid taking place in 378.

It is generally believed that the Khitans emerged from the Yuwen branch of the Xianbei people. Following a defeat at the hands of another branch of the Xianbei in 345, the Yuwen split into three tribes, one of which was called the Kumo Xi. In 388 the Kumo Xi itself split, with one group remaining under the name Kumo Xi and the other group becoming the Khitans. This view is partially backed up by the Book of Wei, which describes the Khitans originating from the Xianbei. Beginning in the Song dynasty, some Chinese scholars suggested that the Khitans might have descended from the Xiongnu people. While modern historians have rejected the idea that the Khitan were solely Xiongnu in origin, there is some support for the claim that they are of mixed Xianbei and Xiongnu origin. Beginning with Rashid-al-Din Hamadani in the fourteenth century, several scholars have theorized that the Khitans were Mongolic in origin, and in the late 19th century, Western scholars made the claim that the Khitans were Tungusic in origin (modern linguistic analysis has discredited this claim. The Khitans shaved their heads, leaving hair on their temples which grew down to the chest, in a similar fashion to the related Kumo Xi, Shiwei, and Xianbei.

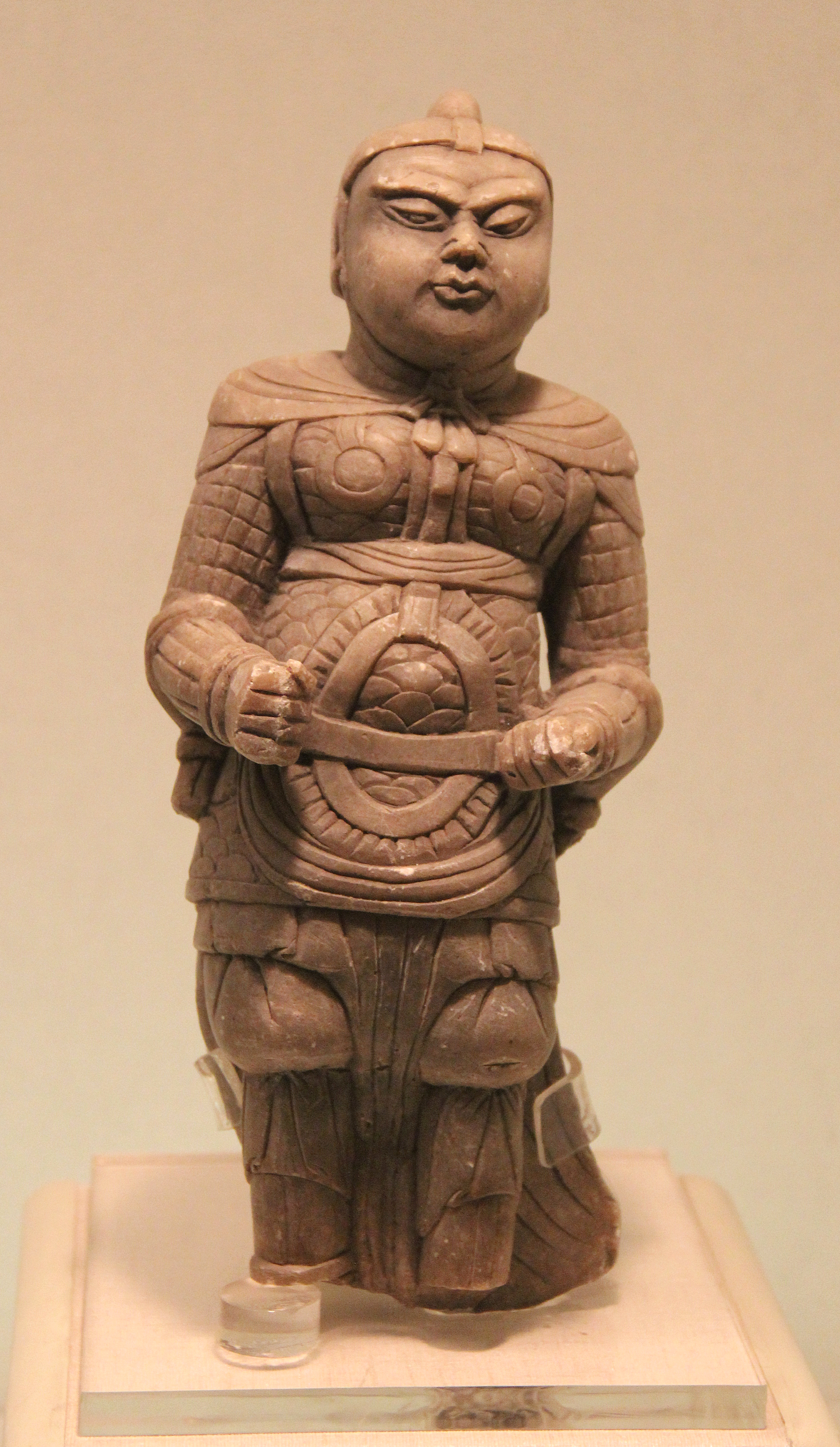
Liao figure pictured at the Liaoning Museum in Shenyang

After splitting from the Yuwen, the Khitans and Kumo Xi fled to the region of Songmo (modern southern Hexigten Banner and western Ongniud Banner). According to the New Book of Tang, the territory of the Khitans rested on what is now the area south of Xar Moron River and east of the Laoha between Chaoyang, Liaoning. The Khitans then faced a joint invasion by the Rouran Khaganate and Goguryeo, which caused them to migrate south to the east of Bailang River (modern Daling River).

By the time the Book of Wei was written in 554, the Khitans had formed a state in what is now China's Jilin and Liaoning Provinces. The Khitans suffered a series of military defeats to other nomadic groups in the region, as well as to the Northern Qi (550–577) and Sui (589–618) dynasties. Khitan tribes at various times fell under the influence of the Eastern Turkic Khaganate, Uighurs and Sui and Tang dynasties. In the Book of Sui (Volume 84), the Khitan are described as "bellicose in plundering and raiding borders" and "the most uncourteous and arrogant among all barbarians". According to the History of Liao, the Khitans were nomads who migrated according to the season. They depended on horses for their livelihood and let them graze openly while their men were demobilized. Their men drank kumiss and practiced archery to hunt for their daily needs. Due to their way of life, they often had the upper hand in military affairs.

=== Eight tribes ===
There were eight Khitan tribes: the Xiwandan, Hedahe (Adahe), Fufuyu (Jufufu), Yuling (Yuyuling), Rilian, Piqie (Pilier), Li (black), and Tuliuhan (Tuliuyu). The eight tribes shared power by rotating leadership triennially. The Khitan federation presented tribute to the Northern Yan (409–436), which in return invested the Khitan khan as Prince Guishan. The Khitans also regularly presented tribute to the Northern Wei (386–534) court in the form of horses and animal skins. Trade occurred on the border in Helong (modern Chaoyang) and Miyun. In 553, the Khitans suffered a defeat to the armies of Northern Qi (550–577) and lost a large portion of their population as well as cattle. For a time they resided in Goguryeo. In 584, they submitted to the Sui dynasty (581–618). In 605, they raided the Sui dynasty, but Emperor Yang of Sui convinced the Türks to attack the Khitans, who lost 40,000 men and women. The eight tribes of old dispersed. Only two Khitan leaders are known from this period: Hechen and Wuyu. The title of Khitan chieftains was Mofuhe or Mohefu.

=== Dahe Confederation ===
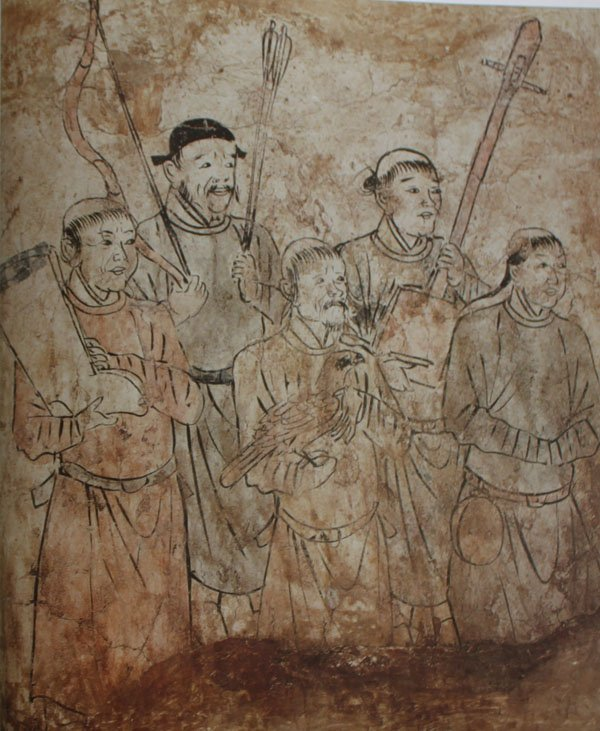
Khitan tomb mural in Inner Mongolia – attendants holding a musical instrument, bow and arrows, boots, and a falcon

Sometime during the Sui dynasty, the military organization of the Khitans became more advanced. According to the Book of Sui, "In the case of a military operation, the chieftains discussed it together. In mobilizing troops, tallies needed to be matched". In the early 7th century, the Dahe clan unified the Khitan tribes in a federation capable of raising 34,000 troops. The tribal composition of the Dahe Confederation is listed as Daji, Hebian, Duhuo, Fenwen, Tubian, Ruixi, Zhuijin, and Fu. The Hedahe were the leading tribe of the Confederation, from which its name is taken from. Other tribes mentioned are: Danjieli, Yishihuo, Shihuo, Nawei, Pinmo, Nahuiji, Jijie, and Xiwa. The component tribes were largely autonomous and the Dahe were only responsible for foreign affairs. After the Dahe united the Khitans, the system of rotating leadership was replaced by "Shixuan", electing a leader based on their talent and ability from the Dahe lineage. The other clans had the right to vote but not to be elected. Brothers, cousins, and nephews often succeeded rather than the son of the previous leader.

The Dahe Confederation submitted to the Tang in both 628 and 648, under the leadership of Mohui and Kuge respectively. The Khagan of the Eastern Turks, Jiali Khan, offered to exchange the rebel Liang Shidu for the Khitans, but Emperor Taizong would not agree to the exchange. Kuge was appointed the Governor-general of Songmo and several prefectures were set up for Khitan tribes: Qiaoluo for the Daji, Tanhan for the Hebian, Wufeng for the Duhuo, Yuling for the Fenwen, Rilian for the Tubian, Tuhe for the Ruixi, Wandan for the Zhuijin, Pili for the Fu. The chieftains of the tribes were appointed as prefects. The Tang emperor bestowed the imperial surname Li on the Dahe and appointed their leader to a governorship that was "an office specifically created for the indirect management of the Khitan tribes". Some Khitan tribes such as the Songmo, Xuanzhou, Neiji, Yishige, and Yishihuo were not included in the Dahe Confederation. The Neiji tribe led by Sun Aocao submitted to the Tang in 619. Aocao's great-grandson Sun Wanrong was appointed prefect of Guicheng.

Towards the turn of the century, however, Tang control of the north began to slip. The Governor-general of Yingzhou, Zhao Wenhui, regarded the Khitan chieftains as his servants. The Khitan chieftain Sun Wanrong and his brother-in-law, the governor of Songmo, Li Jinzhong, felt insulted and bullied by Zhao. In 696, a famine occurred in Khitan territory and Zhao failed to provide relief, sparking a rebellion. The Dahe leader, Li Jinzhong, captured Yingzhou and declared himself "Wushang Khagan" (paramount khagan). The Tang sent 28 generals against the Khitans but were defeated at Xiashi Gorge (Lulong County). The Tang troops continued to suffer defeat until Li Jinzhong died of disease. Qapaghan Qaghan of the Second Turkic Khaganate offered to aid the Tang in return for subdued Türkic households under Tang control. The Türks attacked the Khitans from the north while the Tang invaded from the south. The Khitans suffered a heavy defeat before Sun Wanrong rescued the situation and counterattacked, seizing Yingzhou and Youzhou. A 170,000 strong Tang army was defeated by the Khitans. Another 200,000 soldiers were sent against the Khitans but failed to stop their advance. However the Khitans failed to account for the Türks sacking their capital, Xincheng, and the defection of the Kumo Xi from their ranks. Sun Wanrong was killed by his servant. Although the rebellion was defeated, it took over fifteen years from 700 to 714 before the Tang were able to reassert control over the Khitans. The Türks used their newly conquered territory to launch raids into Hebei.

In 720 the military chief (Yaguan) Ketuyu attacked the reigning Khitan ruler, Suogu, who fled to Yingzhou seeking Chinese protection. General Xue Tai was ordered to punish Ketuyu but he failed and was captured along with Suogu and the Kumo Xi king Li Dapu. Ketuyu enthroned Suogu's cousin Yuyu as the new Khitan ruler. Ketuyu sent tribute to the Tang court but the official in charge treated him with rudeness. Ketuyu murdered the Khitan ruler Shaogu and defected to the Türks. Ketuyu suffered a defeat against the Tang in 732 and fled while his Kumo Xi allies surrendered to the Tang. In 734, Ketuyu defeated a Tang army with the support of his Türkic allies and then lost another battle against Tang forces under the command of Zhang Shougui. The Tang convinced a Khitan military official, Li Guozhe, to murder Ketuyu and the Khitan ruler Qulie, who had been enthroned by Ketuyu.

=== Yaonian Confederation ===
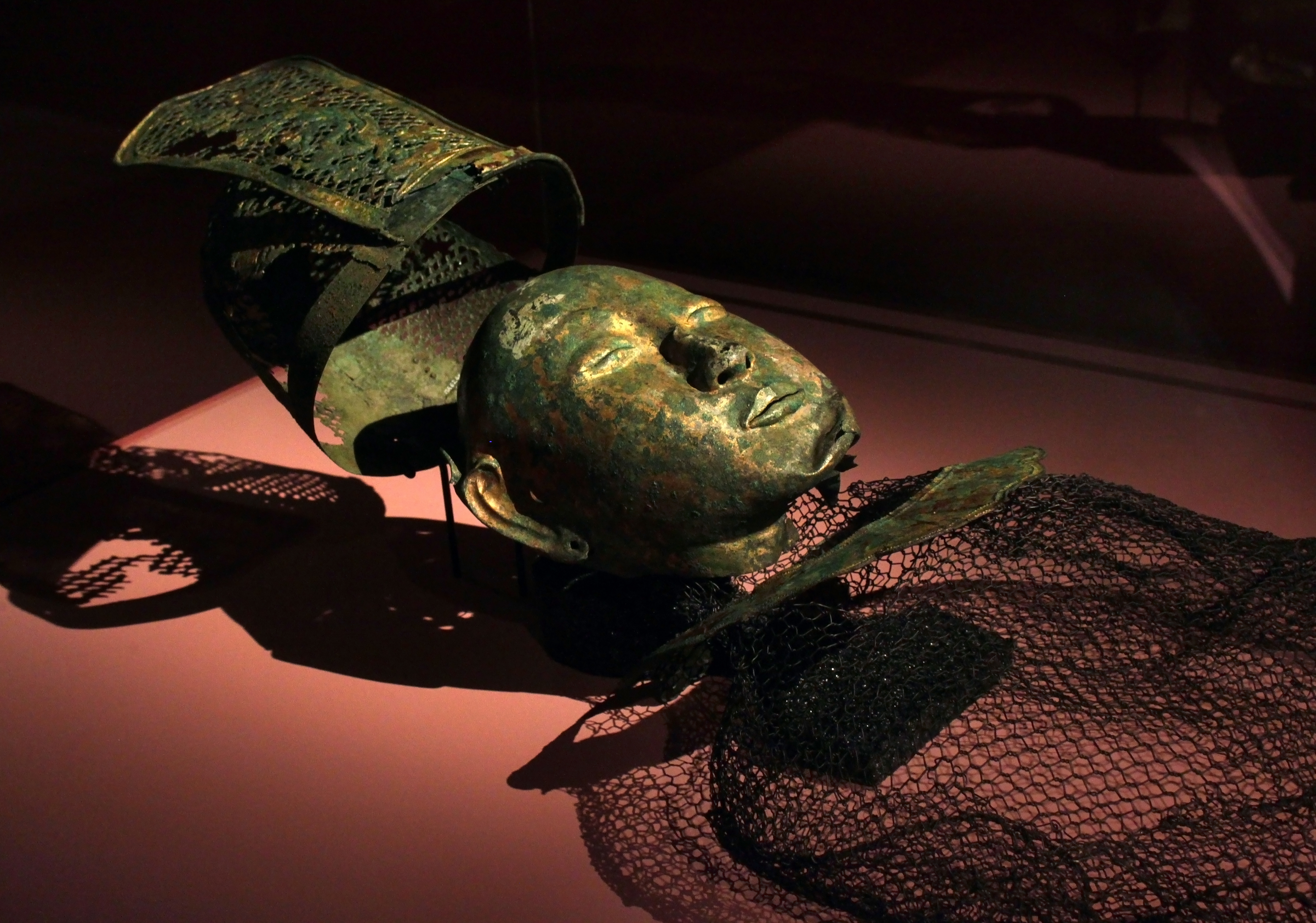
Liao dynasty burial suit made of gilded bronze funerary mask and headdress (female), silver wire shroud, 11th century

The rebellion of Ketuyu ended Dahe supremacy in 730. Li Guozhe, chief of the Yishihuo tribe, and Nieli, also from the Yishihuo tribe, founded a new confederation. Nieli enthroned Zuwu Khagan from the Yaonian clan as the supreme ruler of the Khitans, while Nieli became the military chief. Although there was a khagan, the military chief's power actually exceeded that of the khagan throughout the duration of the confederation. The ten tribes of the Yaonian Confederation consisted of the Danlijie, Yishihuo, Shihuo, Nawei, Pinmo, Nahuiji, Jijie, Xiwa, Yaonian, and Yila. Other tribes are also mentioned: the Yishi, Pin, Chute, Wukui, Niela, Tulübu, and Tuju.

The Tang governor An Lushan launched two invasions into Khitan territory in 751 and 755. After being soundly defeated by the Khitans during the first invasion, An Lushan was successful in the second. An then led a rebellion against the Tang that included Khitan troops in his army. An had a Khitan eunuch named Li Zhuer who worked for him as a teenager but An Lushan castrated him. Li Zhuer was highly trusted by An Lushan, and he and two other men served as his personal attendants. Li Zhuer was approached by conspirators who wanted to kill An when he became ill and started abusing his subordinates. An was hacked to death by Li Zhuer and another conspirator, Yan Zhuang, who was beaten by An before. The An Lushan rebellion marked the beginning of the end of the Tang dynasty.

Following the An Lushan Rebellion, the Khitans became vassals of the Uyghurs while simultaneously paying tribute to the Tang, a situation that lasted from 755 until the fall of the Uyghurs in 840. There were 29 recorded tribute activities to the Tang from 756 to 841. From 840 until the rise of Abaoji, the Khitans remained a tributary of the Tang dynasty. Towards the end of that period, the Khitans began a series of major conquests. Under the reign of Xianzhi Khagan (860?–882?), the Khitans subjugated the Kumo Xi and Shiwei. Two campaigns were launched against the Kumo Xi. Xianzhi captured 700 Xi households who were later settled as the Dieladieda tribe under Abaoji's reign. Saladi, Abaoji's father, captured 7,000 Xi households and moved them to Qinghe in the region of Raole (west of modern Ningcheng County). During the Xiantong reign period (860–874), Xianzhi sent envoys to the Tang court twice. According to the Zizhi Tongjian, during the Xiantong period, the Khitans' territory expanded drastically and by the time of Abaoji, all the Kumo Xi, Shiwei, Tatars, western Türks, and Jurchens had been defeated.

=== Liao dynasty ===
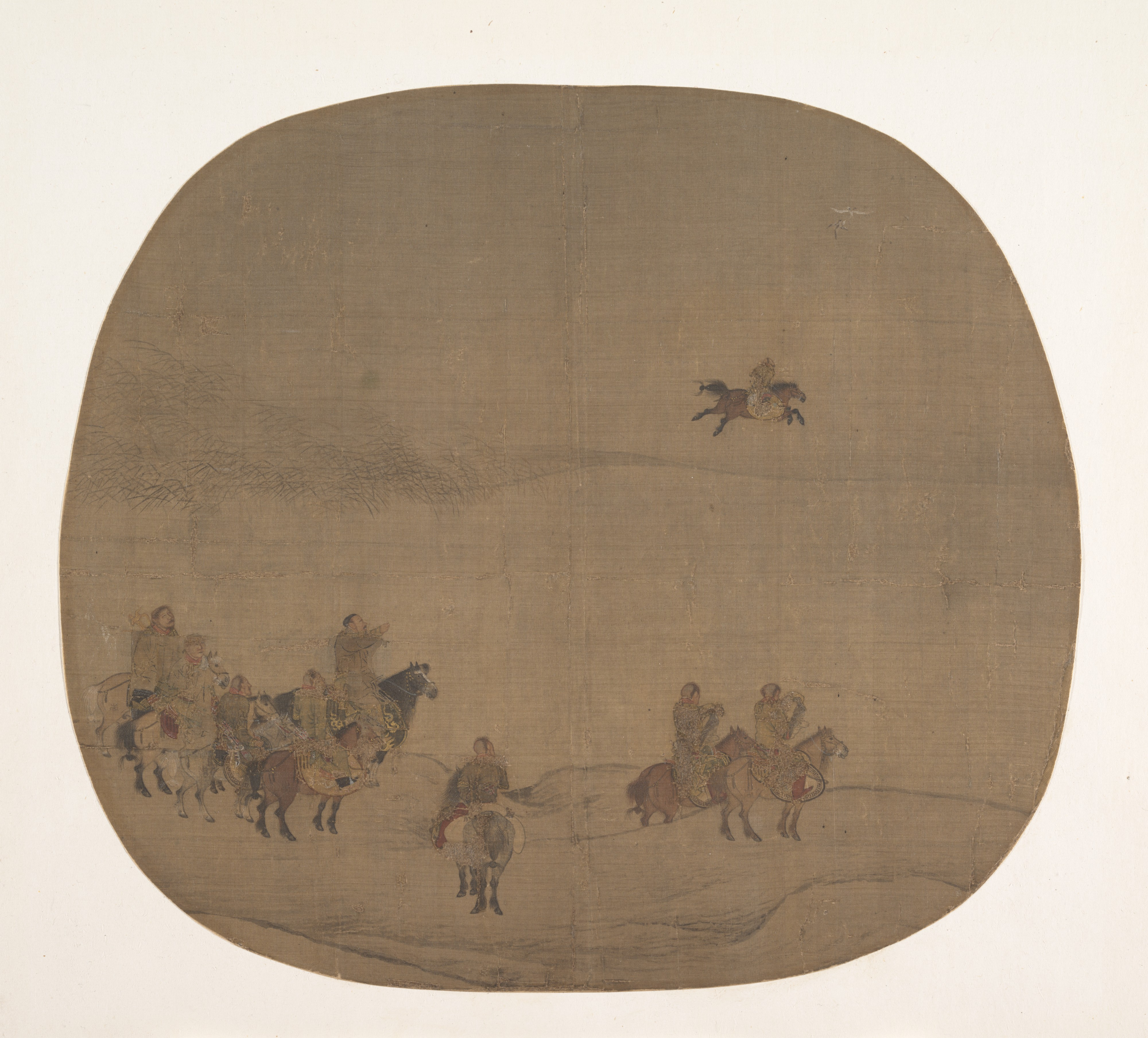
Khitan falconers in a painting by Chen Juzhong, early 13th c.

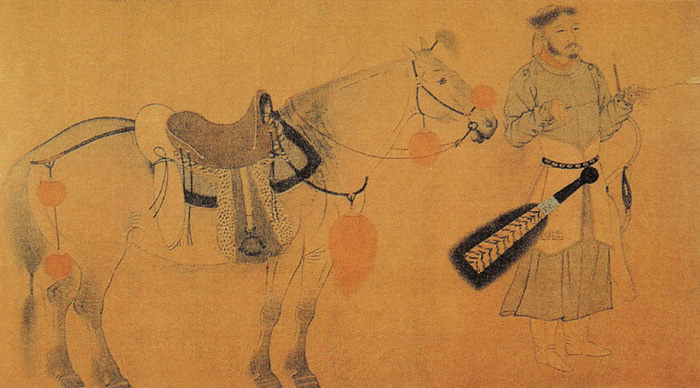
Depiction of Yelü Bei

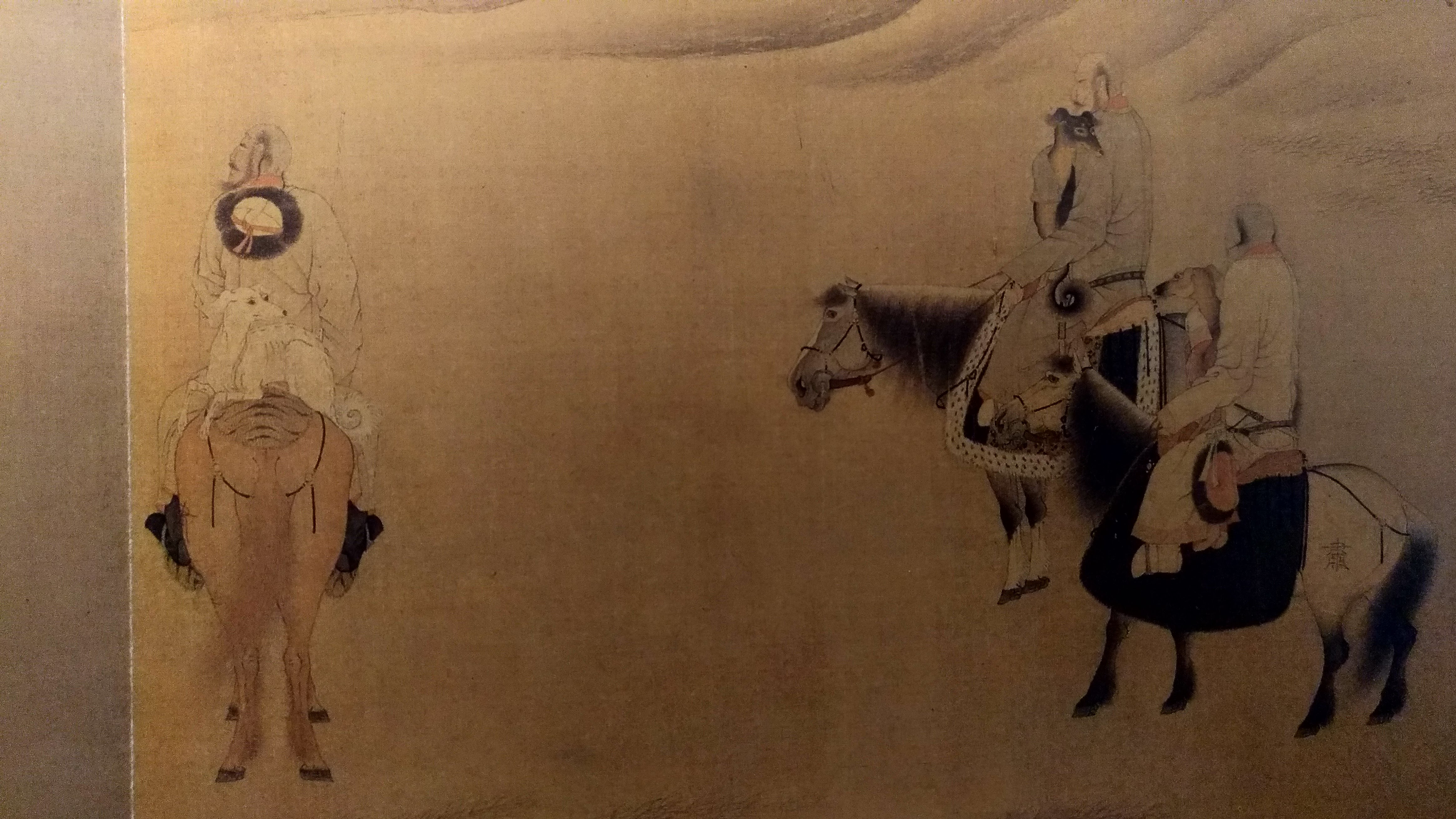
Khitan horsemen

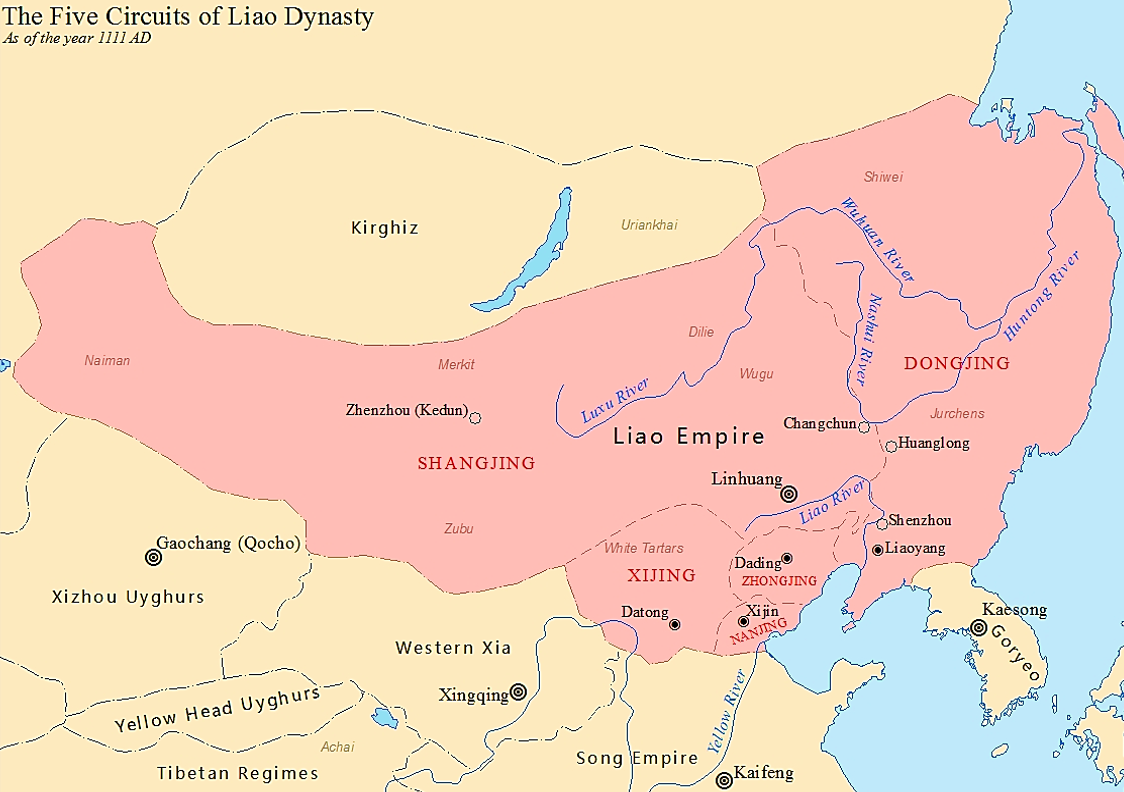
The Liao dynasty in 1111 AD.

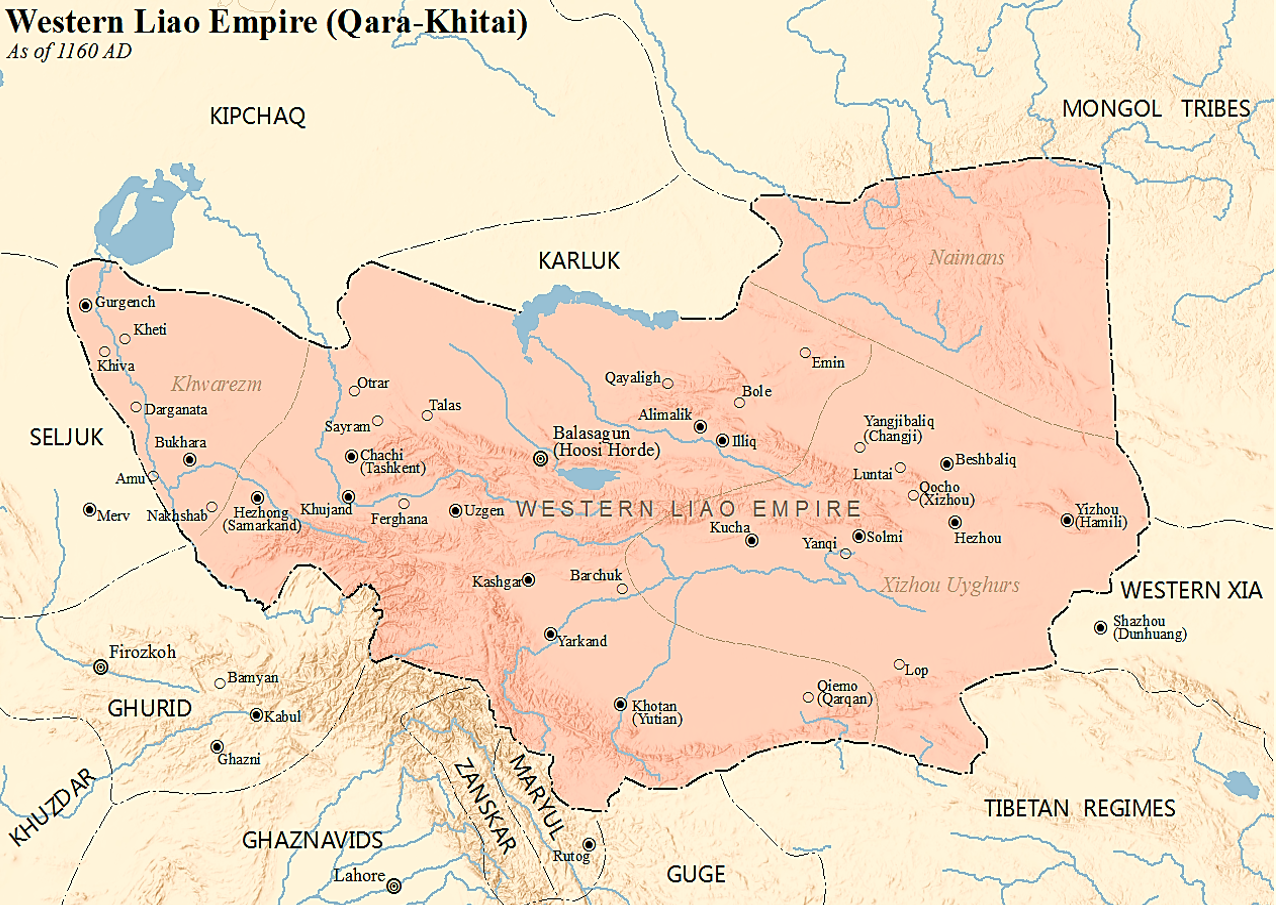
The Qara Khitai empire in 1169 at its greatest extent

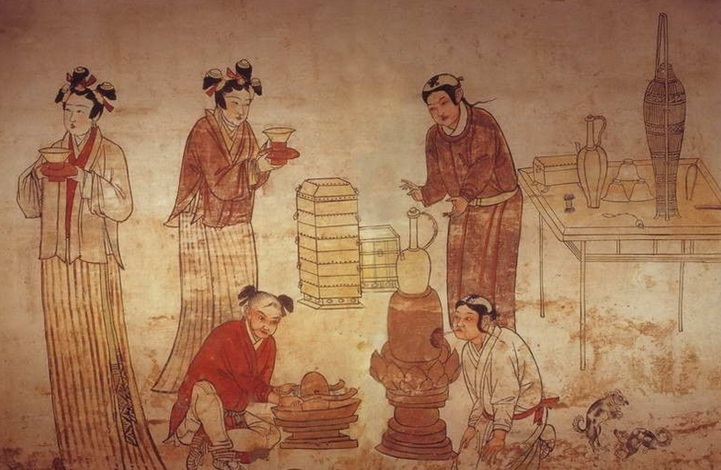
Mural from Inner Mongolia depicting young Khitan boys and girls

Abaoji, who had been successful in uniting the Khitan tribes, founded the Liao dynasty in 907. The Liao territory included modern day northern and northeastern China, Mongolia, and parts of the Korean Peninsula and Siberia. Although transition to an imperial social and political organization was a significant change for the Khitans, the Khitan language, origin myth, shamanic religion, and nomadic lifestyle endured.

China was in chaos after the fall of the Tang dynasty in 907. Known as the Wudai Shiguo period, Five Dynasties ruled northern China in rapid succession with only nominal support from the Ten Kingdoms of southern China. The Tang dynasty had been supported by Shatuo Turks until Zhu Wen murdered the last Tang emperor and founded the Later Liang dynasty. The Shatuo Turks, who had been allied with the Khitans since 905, defeated the Later Liang and founded the Later Tang dynasty in 923, but by 926, the former allies had grown apart. In 934, Yelü Bei, Abaoji's son, wrote to his brother Emperor Taizong of Liao from the Later Tang court: "Li Cong Ke has slain his liege-lord, why not attack him?" In 936, the Khitans supported Shi Jing Tang's rebellion against the Later Tang Emperor Li Cong Ke. Shi Jing Tang became emperor of the Later Jin dynasty and, in exchange for their support, the Khitans gained sixteen new prefectures.

The Later Jin dynasty remained a vassal of the Khitans until the death of Shi Jing Tang in 942, but when the new emperor ascended, he indicated that he would not honor his predecessor's arrangement. The Khitans launched a military invasion against the Later Jin in 944. In January 947, the Emperor of the Later Jin dynasty surrendered to the Khitans. The Khitan emperor left the conquered city of Kaifeng and unexpectedly died from an illness while travelling in May 947.

Relations between Goryeo and the Khitans were hostile after the Khitans destroyed Balhae. Goryeo would not recognize the Liao dynasty and supported the fledgling Song dynasty, which had formed south of the Khitans' territory. Though the Khitans would have preferred to attack China, they invaded Goryeo in 993. Khitan forces failed to advance beyond the Chongchon River and were persuaded to withdraw, though Khitan dissatisfaction with Goryeo's conquest of the Jurchens prompted a second invasion in 1010. This time the Khitans, led by their emperor, sacked the capital city Kaesong. A third and final invasion in 1018 was repelled by Goryeo's forces, bringing an end to 30 years of war between the rivals.

The Liao dynasty proved to be a significant power north of the Chinese plain, continuously moving south and west, gaining control over former Chinese and Turk-Uyghur territories. In 1005 Chanyuan Treaty was signed, and peace remained between the Liao dynasty and the Song dynasty for the next 120 years. During the reign of the Emperor Daozong of Liao, corruption was a major problem and prompted dissatisfaction among many people, including the Jurchens. The Liao dynasty eventually fell to the Jin dynasty of the Jurchen in 1125, who defeated and absorbed the Khitans to their military benefit. The Khitans considered the Khamag Mongols as their last hope when the Liao dynasty was invaded by the Jin, Song dynasty and Western Xia Empires.

To defend against the Jurchens and Khitans, a Long Wall was built by Goryeo in 1033–1034, along with many border forts.

One of the causes of the Jurchen rebellion and the fall of the Liao was the custom of raping married Jurchen women by Khitan envoys, which caused resentment from the Jurchens. The custom of having sex with unmarried girls by the Khitans was itself not a problem, since the practice of guest prostitution – giving female companions, food and shelter to guests – was common among Jurchens. Unmarried daughters of Jurchen families of lower and middle classes in Jurchen villages were provided to Khitan messengers for sex, as recorded by Hong Hao. Song envoys among the Jin were similarly entertained by singing girls in Guide, Henan. There is no evidence that guest prostitution of unmarried Jurchen girls to Khitan men was resented by the Jurchens. It was only when the Khitans forced aristocratic Jurchen families to give up their wives as guest prostitutes to Khitan messengers that the Jurchens became resentful. This suggests that in Jurchen upper classes, only a husband had the right to his married wife while among lower class Jurchens, the virginity of unmarried girls and sex with Khitan men did not impede their ability to marry later. The Jurchens and their Manchu descendants had Khitan linguistic and grammatical elements in their personal names like suffixes. Many Khitan names had a "ju" suffix.

Following the fall of the Liao dynasty, a number of the Khitan nobility escaped the area westwards towards Western Regions, establishing the short-lived Qara Khitai or Western Liao dynasty. After its fall, a small part under Buraq Hajib established a local dynasty in the southern Persian province of Kirman. These Khitans were absorbed by the local Turkic and Iranian populations, Islamized and left no influence behind them. As the Khitan language is still almost completely unintelligible, it is difficult to create a detailed history of their movements.

During the 13th century, the Mongol invasions and conquests had a large impact on shifting ethnic identities in the region. Most people of the Eurasian Steppe did not retain their pre-Mongol identities after the conquests. The Khitans were scattered across Eurasia and assimilated into the Mongol Empire in the early 13th century.

Fleeing from the Mongols, in 1216 the Khitans invaded Goryeo and won several battles, even reaching the gates of the capital, but were defeated by Goryeo General Kim Chwi-ryeo who pushed them back north to Pyongan, where the remaining Khitans were finished off by Goryeo forces in 1219.

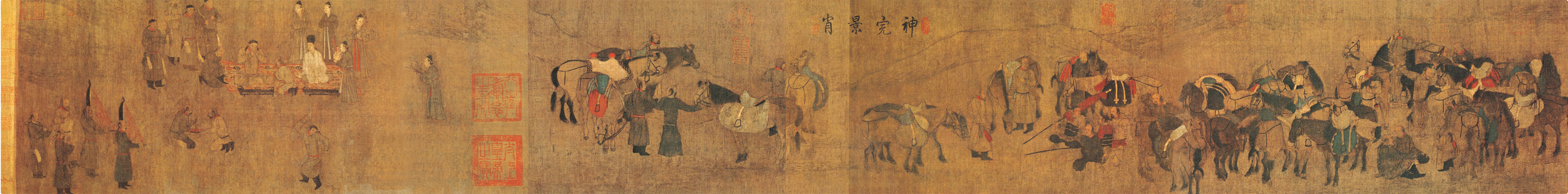
Zhuoxie tu, a 10th-century painting of a rest stop for a Khitan khan

== Language and writing systems ==
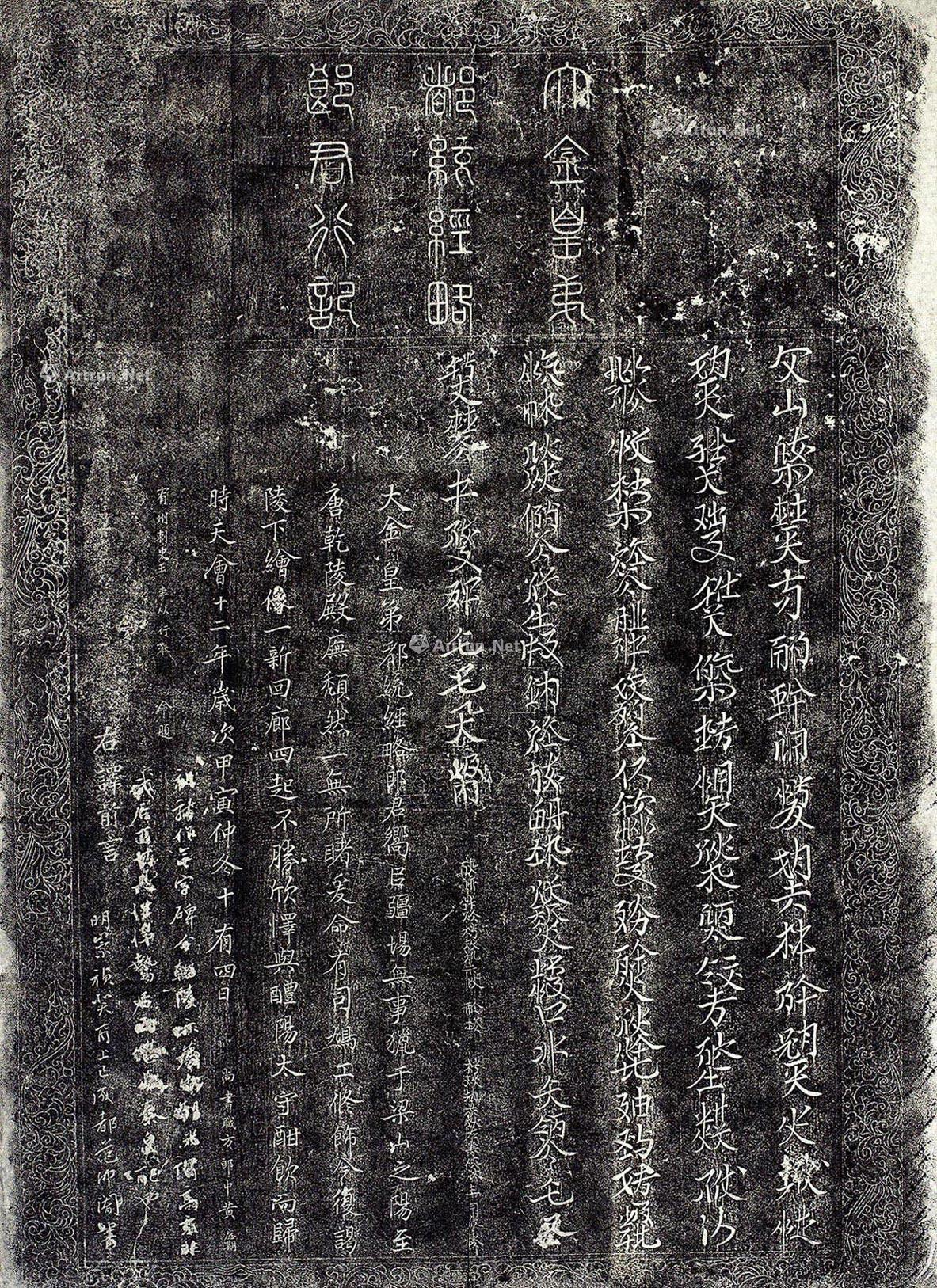
Inscription on the Da Jin huangdi dutong jinglüe langjun xingji stele, in both Khitan small script (lower right) and Chinese (lower left).

The Khitan language is now extinct. Some scholars believe that Khitan is Proto-Mongolic, while others have suggested that it is a Para-Mongolic language. Khitan has loanwords borrowed from the Turkic Old Uyghur language and Koreanic languages.

There were two writing systems for the Khitan language, known as the large script and the small script. These were functionally independent and appear to have been used simultaneously in the Liao dynasty. They were in use for some time after the fall of that dynasty. Examples of the scripts appeared most often on epitaphs and monuments, although other fragments sometimes surface. The Khitan scripts have not been fully deciphered and more research and discoveries will be necessary for a proficient understanding of them.

== Economy ==
Nomadic Khitans originally engaged in stockbreeding, fishing, and hunting. Looting Chinese villages and towns as well as neighboring tribes was also a helpful source of slaves, Chinese handicrafts, and food, especially in times of famine. Under the influence of China, and following the administrative need for a sedentary administration, the Khitans began to engage in farming, crop cultivation and the building of cities. Unlike the Chinese and Balhae farmers, who cultivated wheat and sorghum millet, the Khitan farmers cultivated panicled millet. The ruling class of the Liao dynasty still undertook hunting campaigns in late summer in the tradition of their ancestors. After the fall of the Liao dynasty, the Khitans returned to a more nomadic life.

== Religion ==
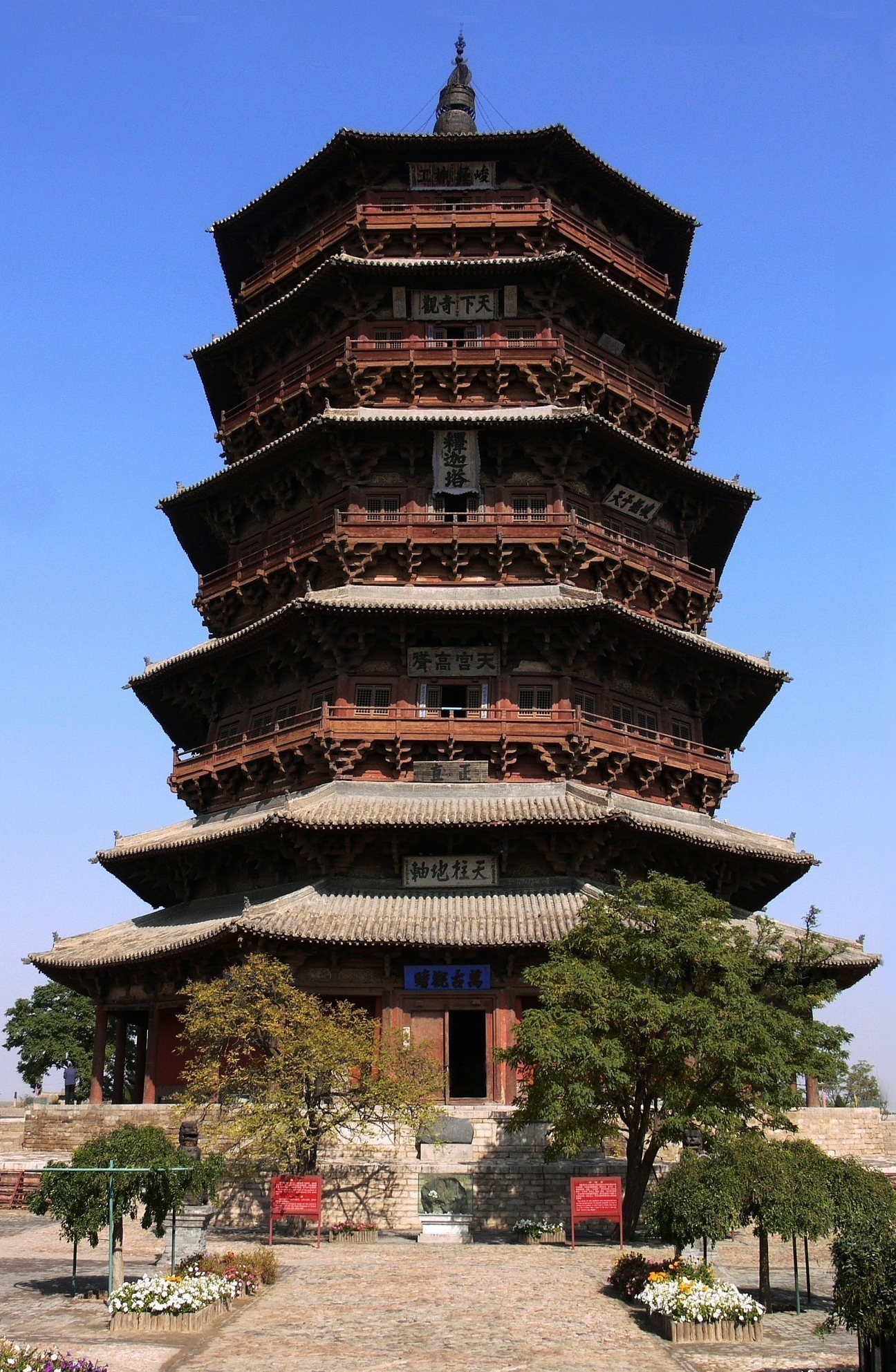
The Pagoda of Fogong Temple, built in 1056.

The Khitans practiced shamanism in which animals played an important role. Hunters offered a sacrifice to the spirit of the animal they were hunting and wore a pelt from the same animal during the hunt. There were festivals to mark the catching of the first fish and wild goose, and annual sacrifices of animals to the sky, earth, ancestors, mountains, rivers, and others. Every male member of the Khitan would sacrifice a white horse, white sheep, and white goose during the Winter solstice.

When a Khitan nobleman died, burnt offerings were sacrificed at the full and new moons. The body was exposed for three years in the mountains, after which the bones would be cremated. The Khitan believed that the souls of the dead rested at a place called the Black Mountain, near Rehe Province.

Khitan tents always faced east, and they revered the sun, but the moon did not have a large role in their religion. They also practiced a form of divination where they went to war if the shoulder blade of a white sheep cracked while being heated (scapulimancy).

== Women ==
=== Warrior women ===
Khitan women were taught how to hunt, rode horses, practiced archery, and managed family herds, flocks, finances, and property when their husbands were at war. Upper-class women were able to hold governmental and military posts. A number of elite women such as Shulü Ping (Empress Yingtian), her niece Xiao Wen (Empress Jing'an), and grand-niece Xiao Yanyan (Empress Chengtian) took part in military affairs, accompanied the emperor in battle, commanded their own armies, and went hunting. During the Qara Khitai period, Khitan women held uniquely high positions and military power. In one recorded incident, Khitan women were told to put on men's clothing and fight in battle. This type of behavior was not unknown among other neighboring peoples during the time and could be found in Turkic and Mongol society as well. However, none of the warrior women other than Khitans ruled in their own name. Han Chinese living under the Liao dynasty were not forced to adopt Khitan practices, and while some Han Chinese did, many did not.

=== Marriage ===
Khitan elites tended to marry women who were their senior, resulting in an age gap between husband and wife. Among the ruling Yelü clan, the average age of marriage for boys was sixteen, while the average age that girls married was between sixteen and twenty-two. Although rare, ages as young as twelve were recorded for both boys and girls. Polygamy was practiced by Khitan men who had multiple wives. A specific kind of polygamy called sororate was also practiced among the elite, in which a man would marry two or more women who were sisters. Sororate polygamy continued throughout the length of the Liao dynasty despite laws banning the practice. Over the course of the dynasty, the Khitan elite moved away from having several wives towards the Han practice of having one wife and one or more concubines. This was done largely to smooth over the process of inheritance. The Liao emperor took wives from other ethnic groups such as the Han, Koreans, and Turkic peoples.

Among Khitan commoners, women did not have arranged marriages and would attract suitors by singing and dancing in the streets that served as self-advertisements, with the women describing their beauty, familial status, and domestic skills. Virginity was not a marriage requirement among the Khitans. Betrothal was seen in Khitan society as important if not more important to marriage itself, and was difficult to annul. The groom would pledge to work for three years for the bride's family, pay a bride price, and lavish the bride's family with gifts. After three years, the groom was allowed to take the bride back to his home, and the bride would usually cut off all ties with her family. Abduction of marriage-age women was common. Khitan men of all social classes participated in abductions of both Khitan and Han women. In some cases, the abduction was a pre-arranged step in the courtship process and the woman agreed to it and the resulting sexual intercourse, after which the abductor and abductee would return to the woman's home to announce their intention to marry. This process was known as baimen (拜門). In other cases, the abduction was non-consensual and resulted in rape. Khitan women had the right to divorce and were able to remarry after divorce.

== Genetics ==
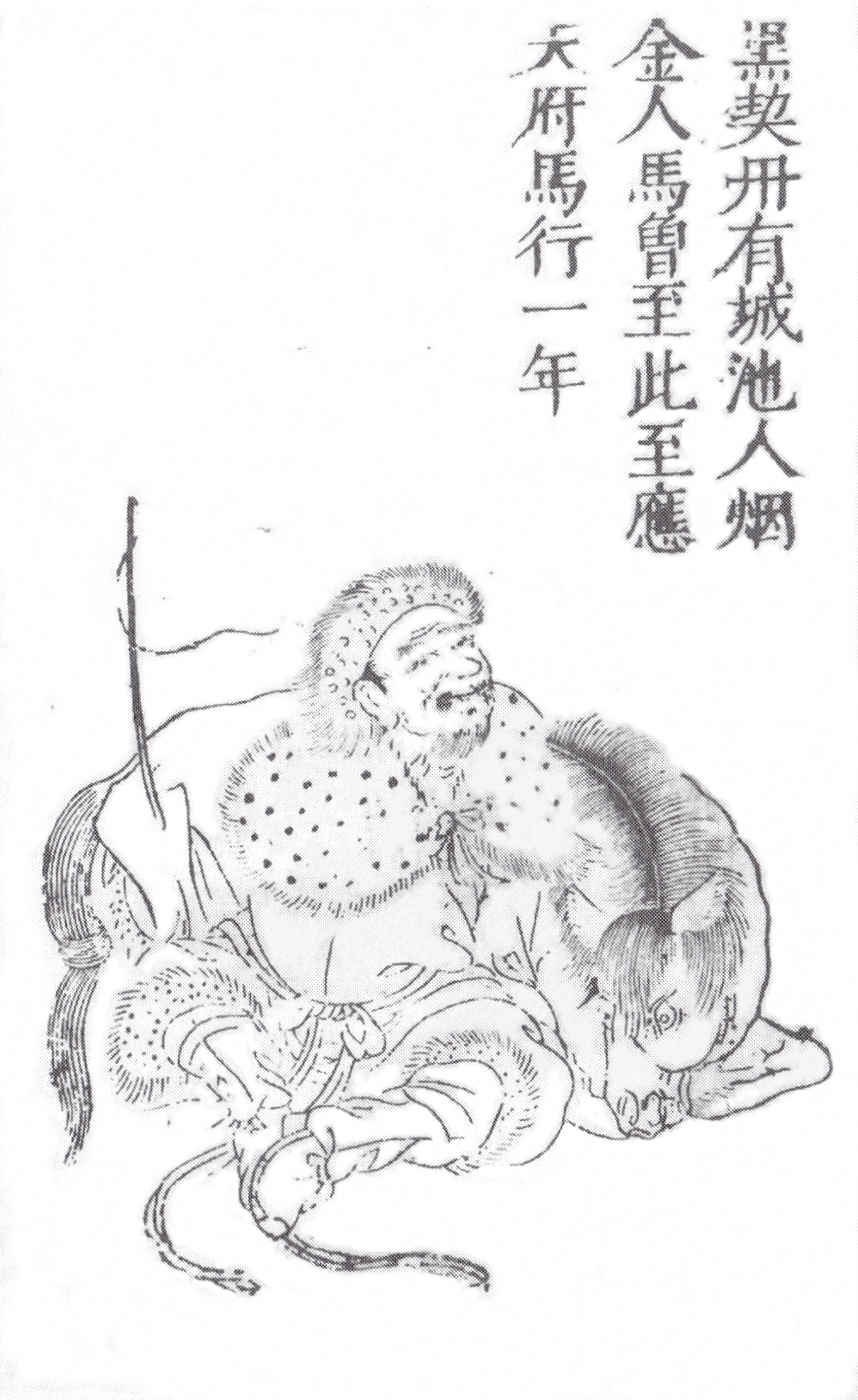
Ming dynasty depiction of a Kara-Khitan man, from Sancai Tuhui

A 2015 study postulated that Khitan males may have belonged to haplogroups C3c or N1, based on the distribution of these haplogroups in modern-day Eastern and Northern Asian populations.

A 2020 study published in Cell analyzed the DNA of 3 Khitan burials from Bulgan Province, located in Northern Mongolia. The Khitan burials were found to be of predominantly Northeast Asian origin, with less than 10% West Eurasian ancestry. The two male specimens belonged to the West Eurasian paternal haplogroup J2. All three specimens carried maternal haplogroups associated with Northeast Asia, including haplogroups A24, D4 and haplogroup Y1. During the Khitan and Mongol empires, a male bias for East-Asian related ancestry is observed in the eastern steppe region.

Two studies found evidence of Khitan mtDNA ancestry in modern-day people of the Daur ethnicity. This was one of the most significant findings of ethnic studies in China. Another group of 100,000 descendants are found in some Blang people and Yi people in Baoshan and Ruili in southwestern Yunnan province, near Myanmar. These people with surnames of A., Mang and Jiang claim to be descendants of Khitans rather than Blang people or Yi people.

== Gallery ==
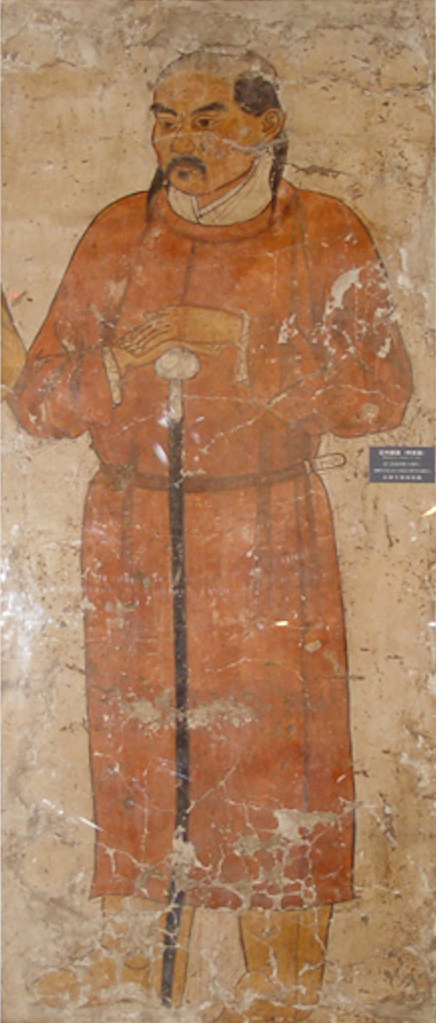
Fresco of a Khitan man

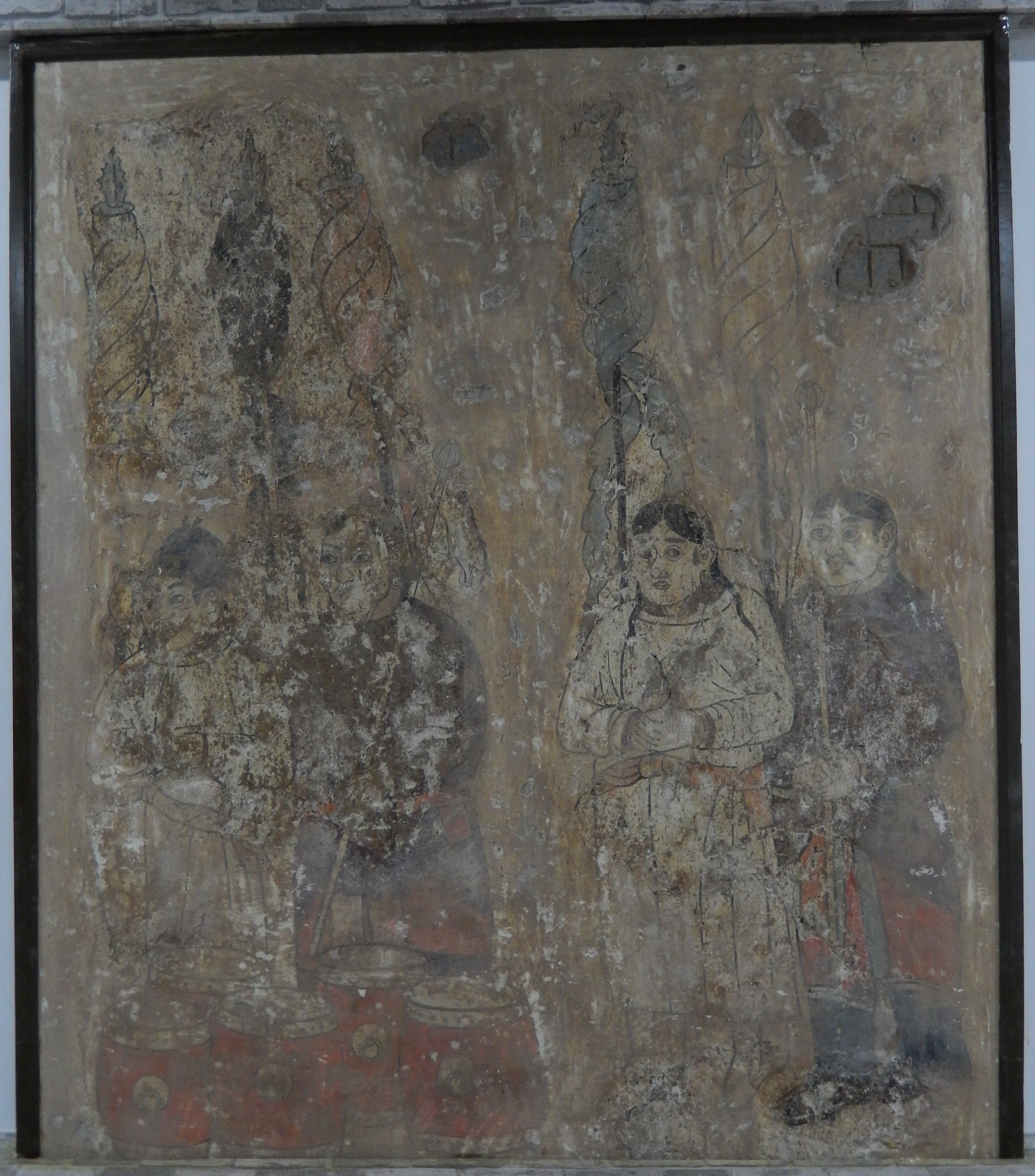
Khitans holding wrapped up banners, maces, and drums

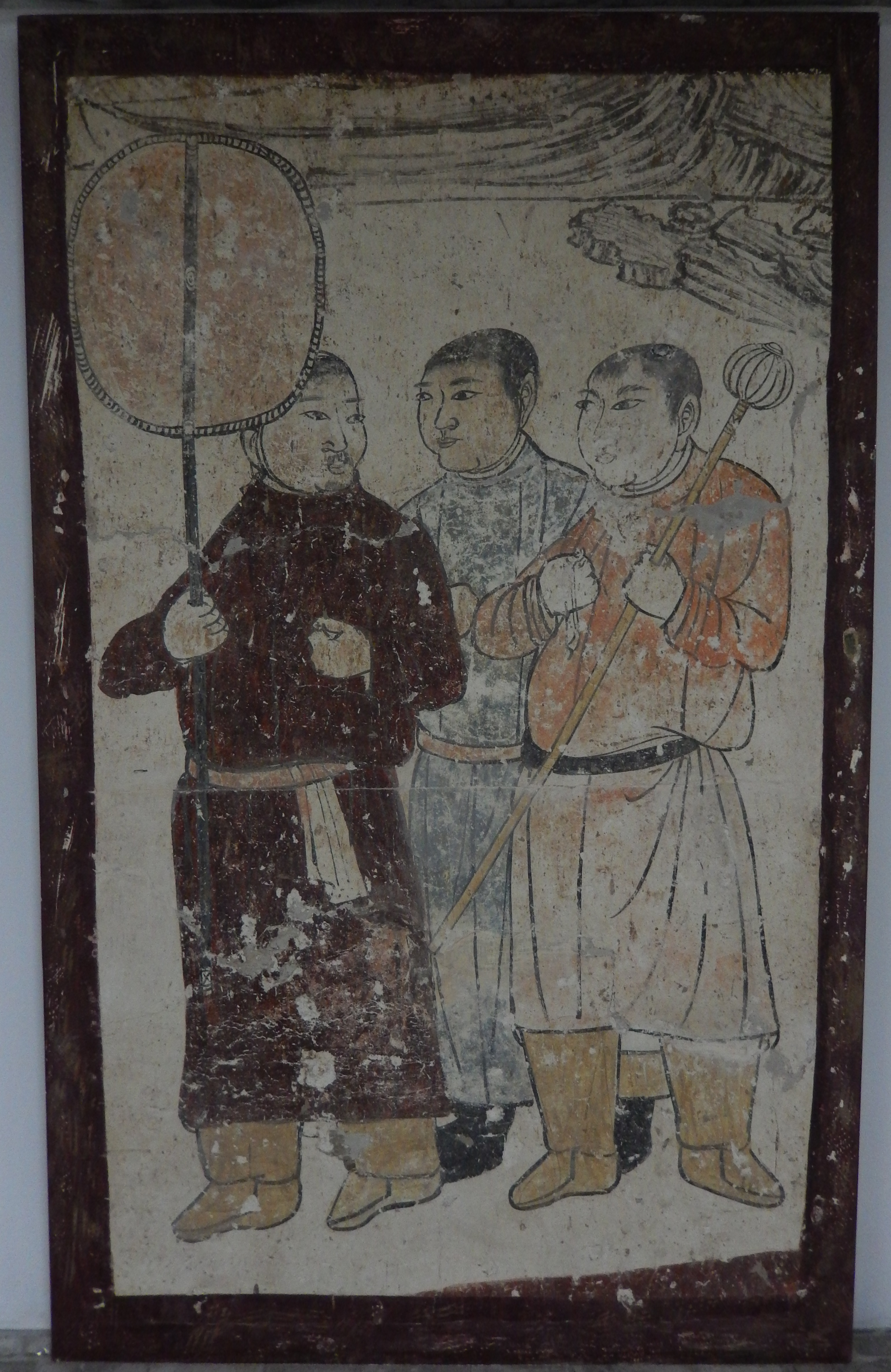
Khitan mace man

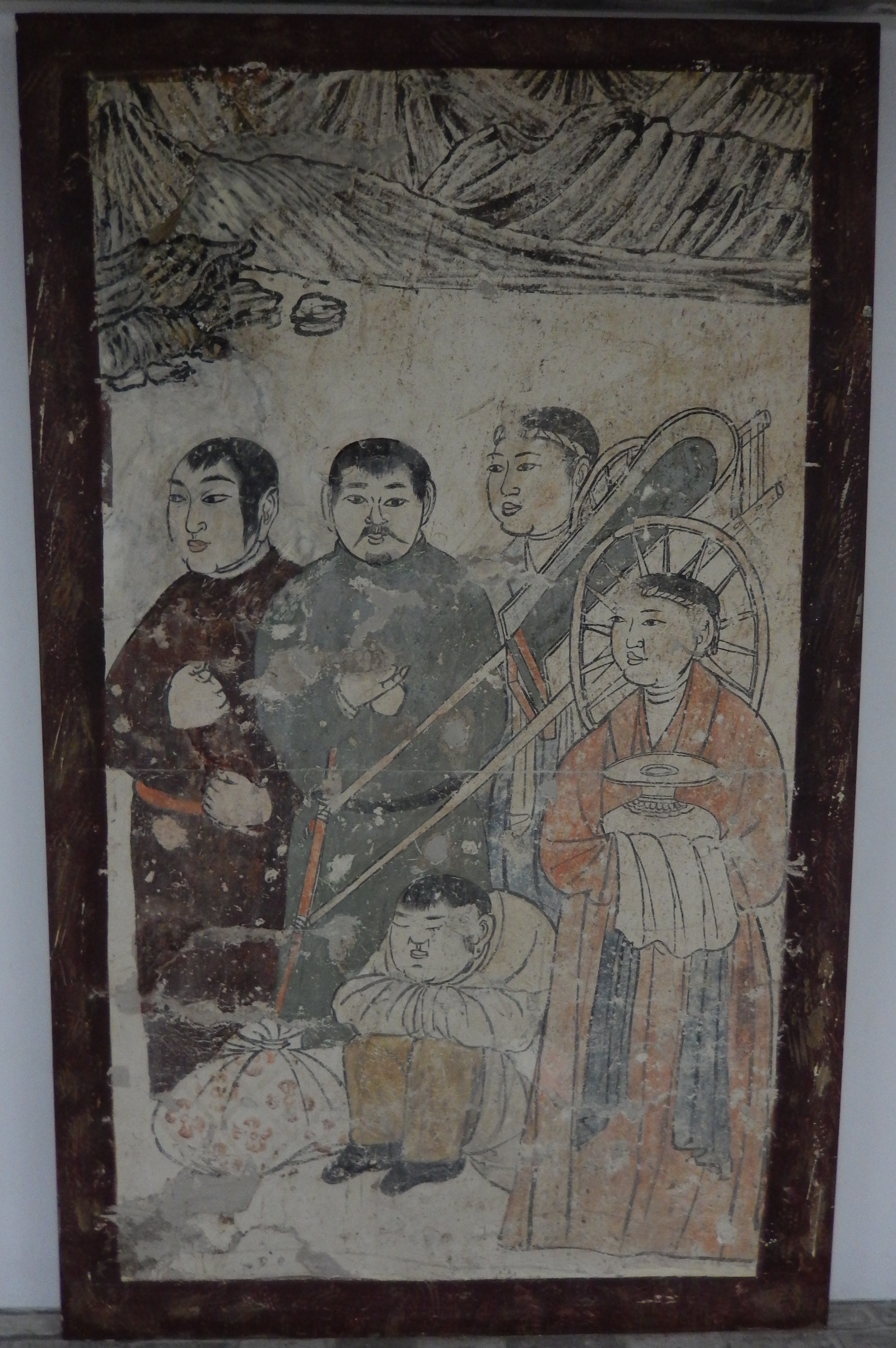
Halahaicheng tomb mural

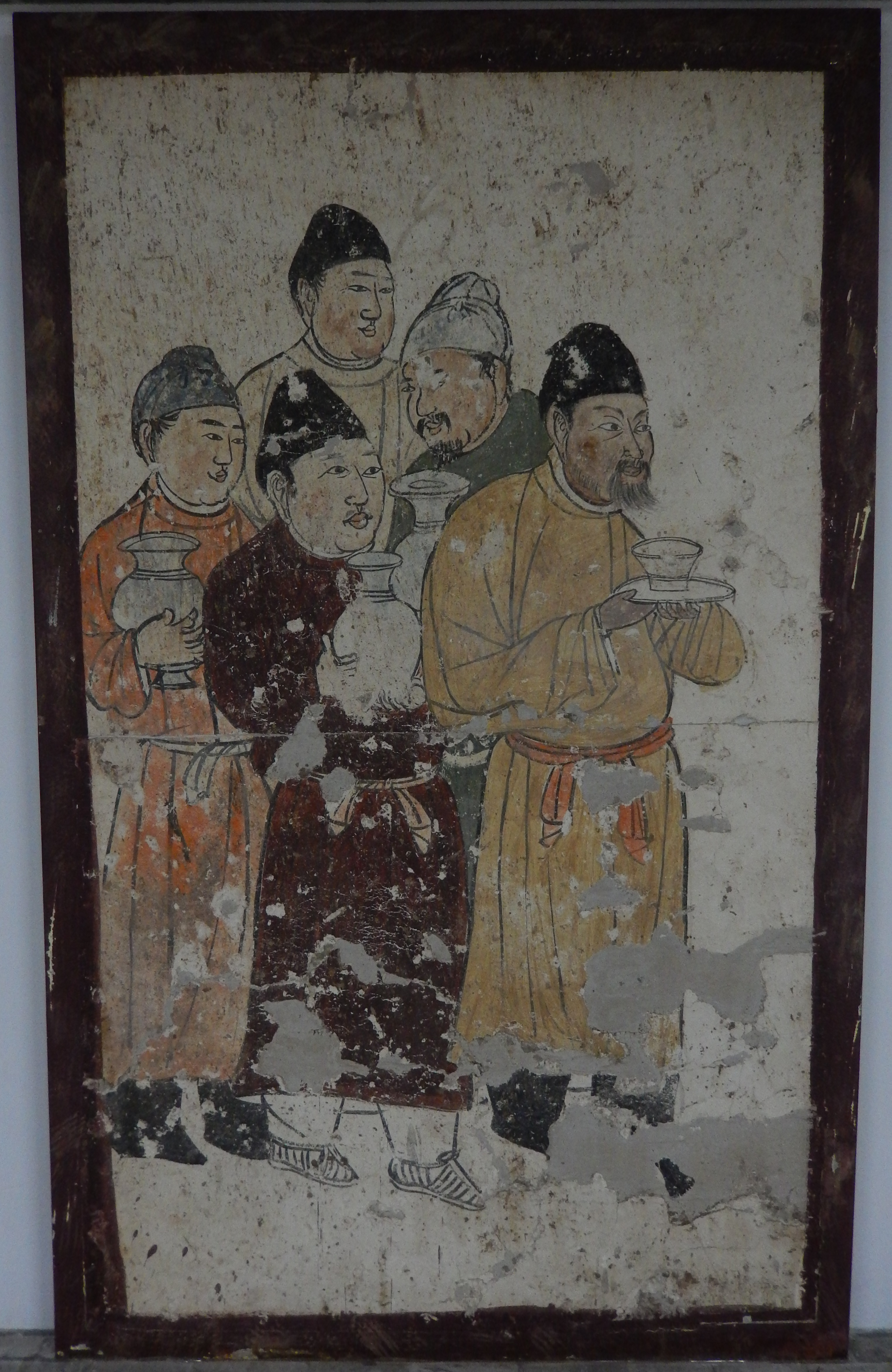
Halahaicheng tomb mural

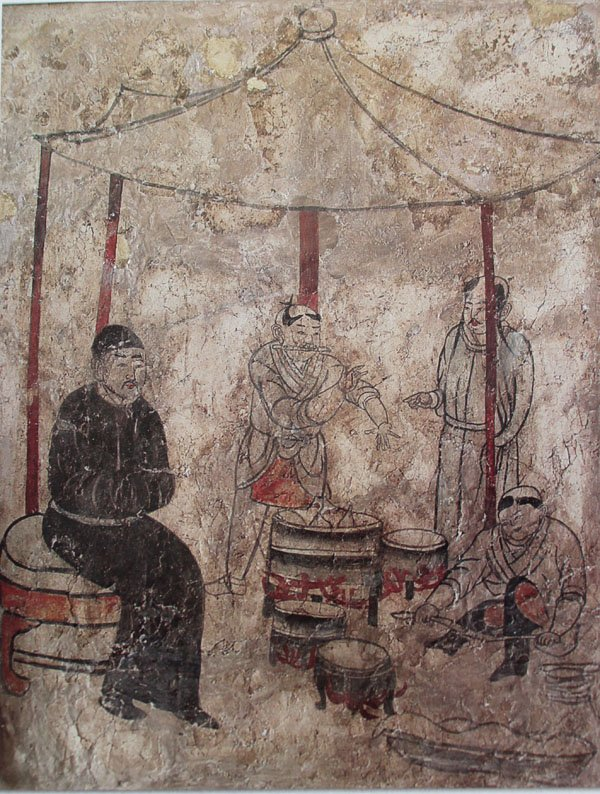
Cooks

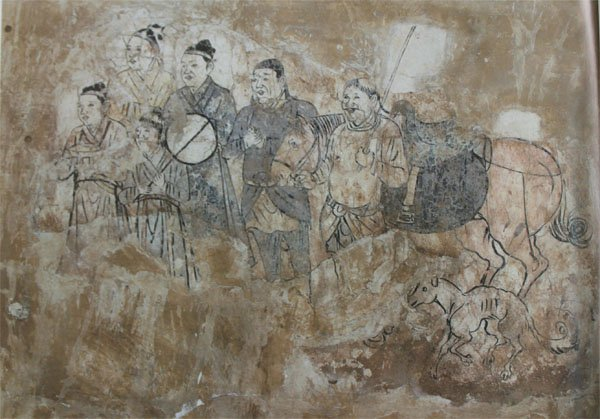
Mural from tomb in Aohan, Liao dynasty

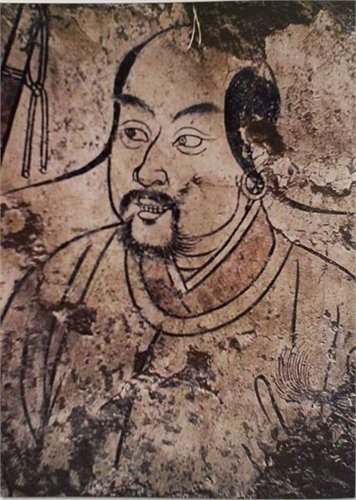
Hairstyle

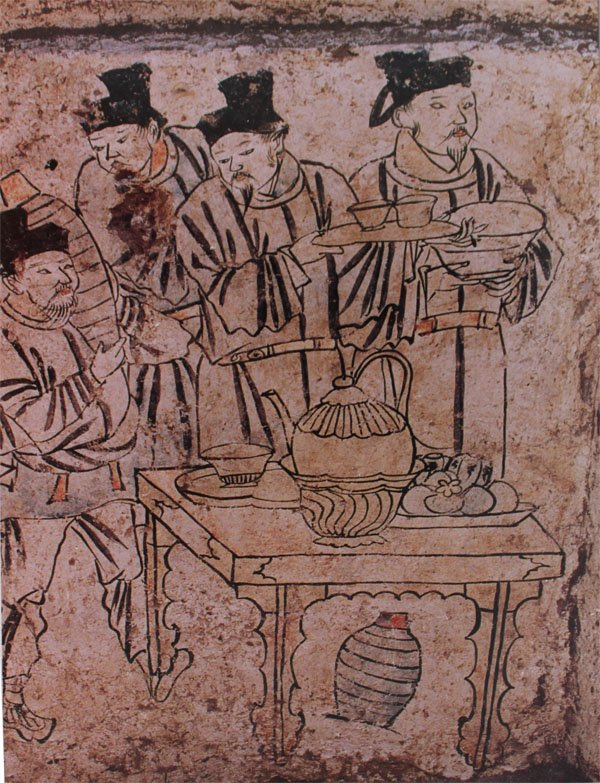
Aohan tomb of men preparing drinks

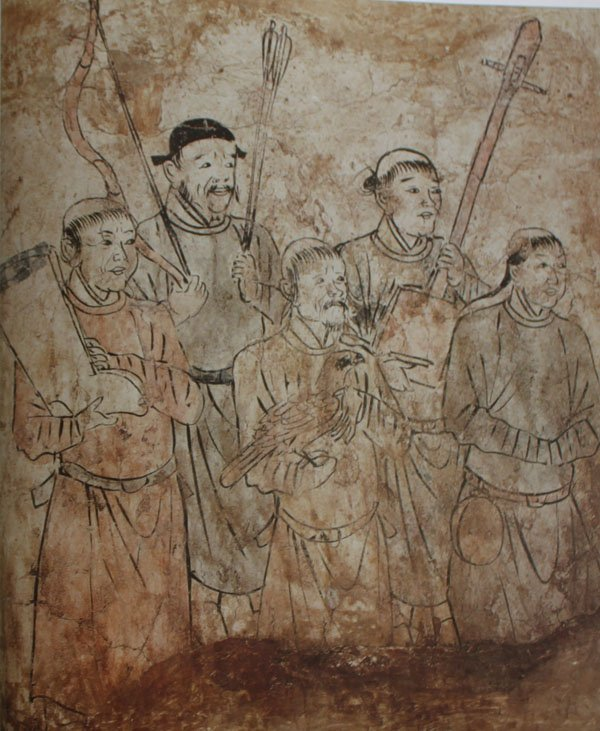
Hunters

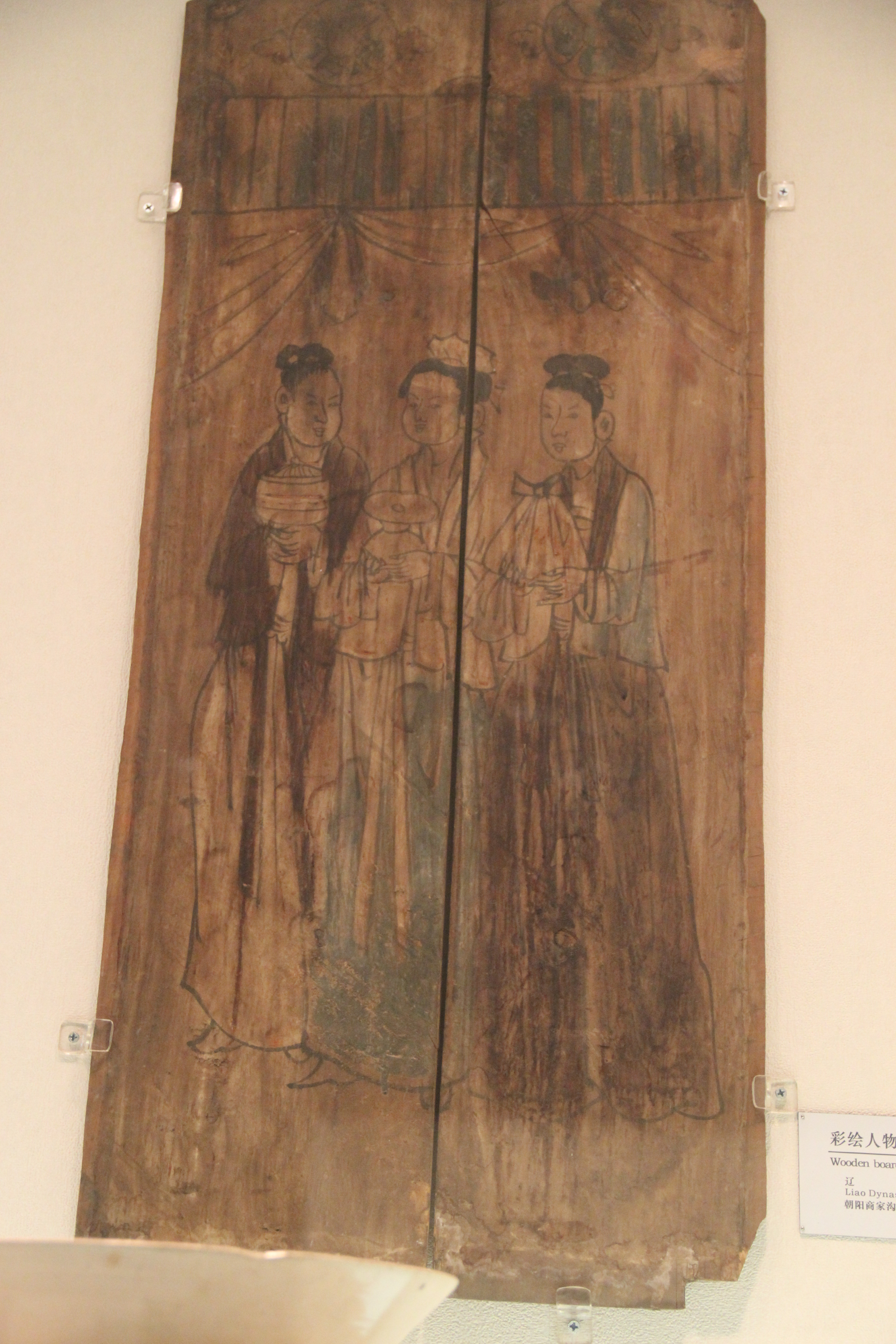
Khitan women, painted on wood.

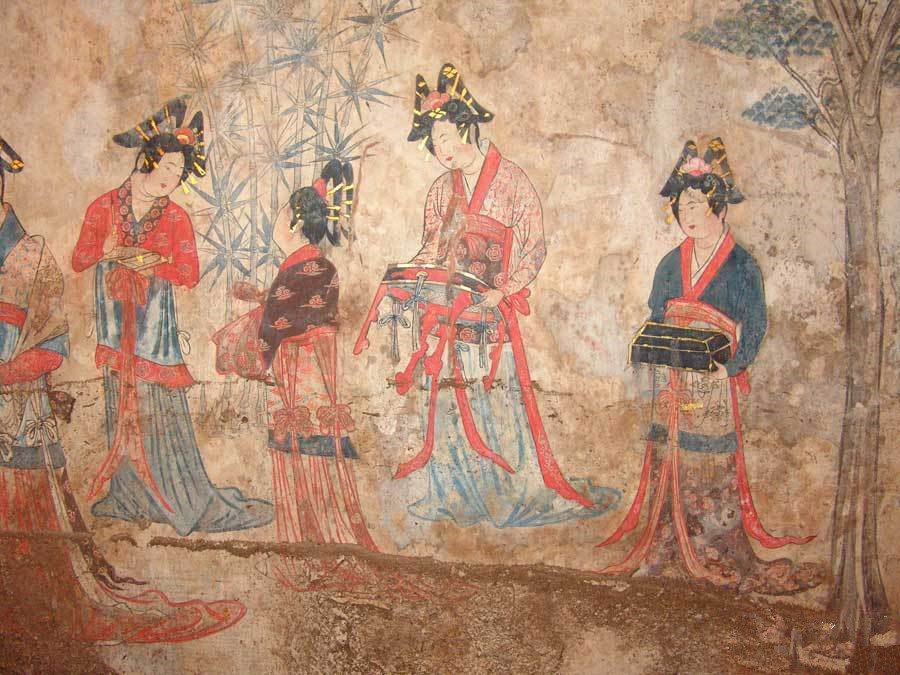
Women

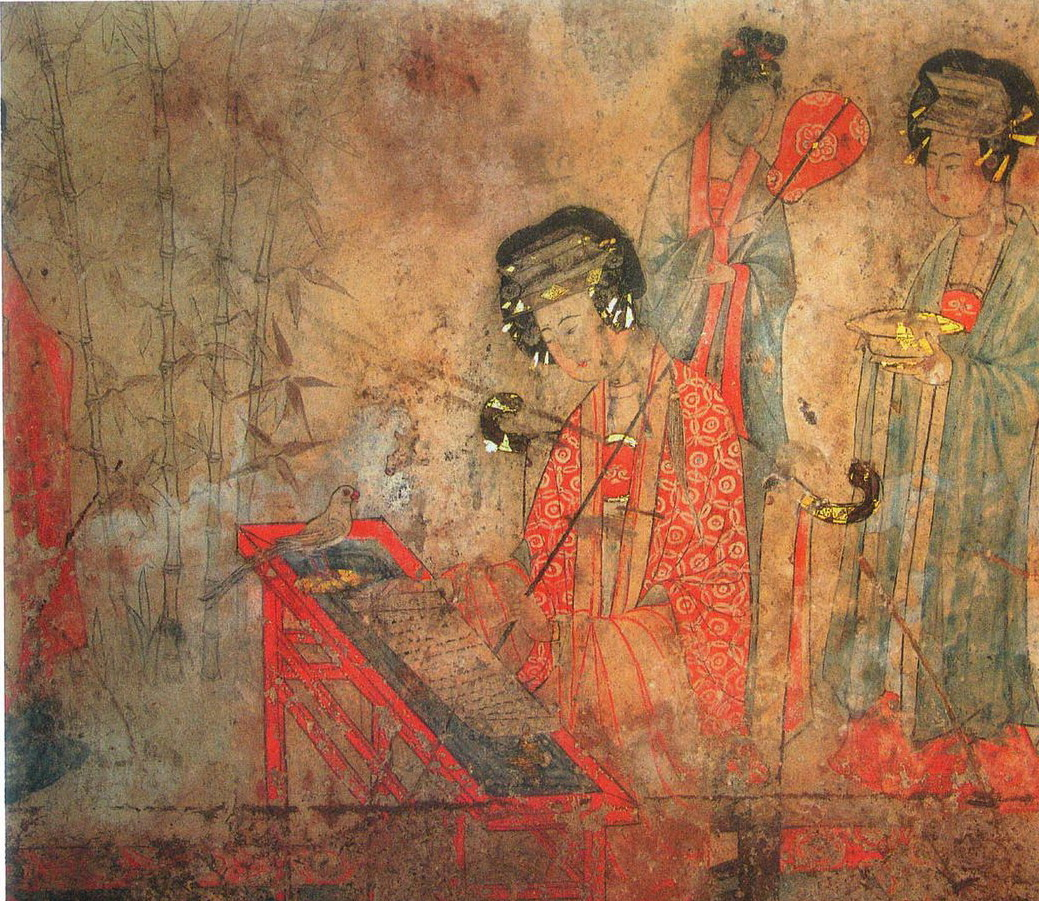
Women

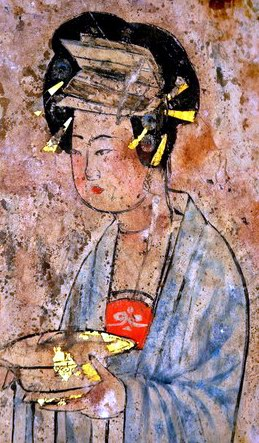
Woman

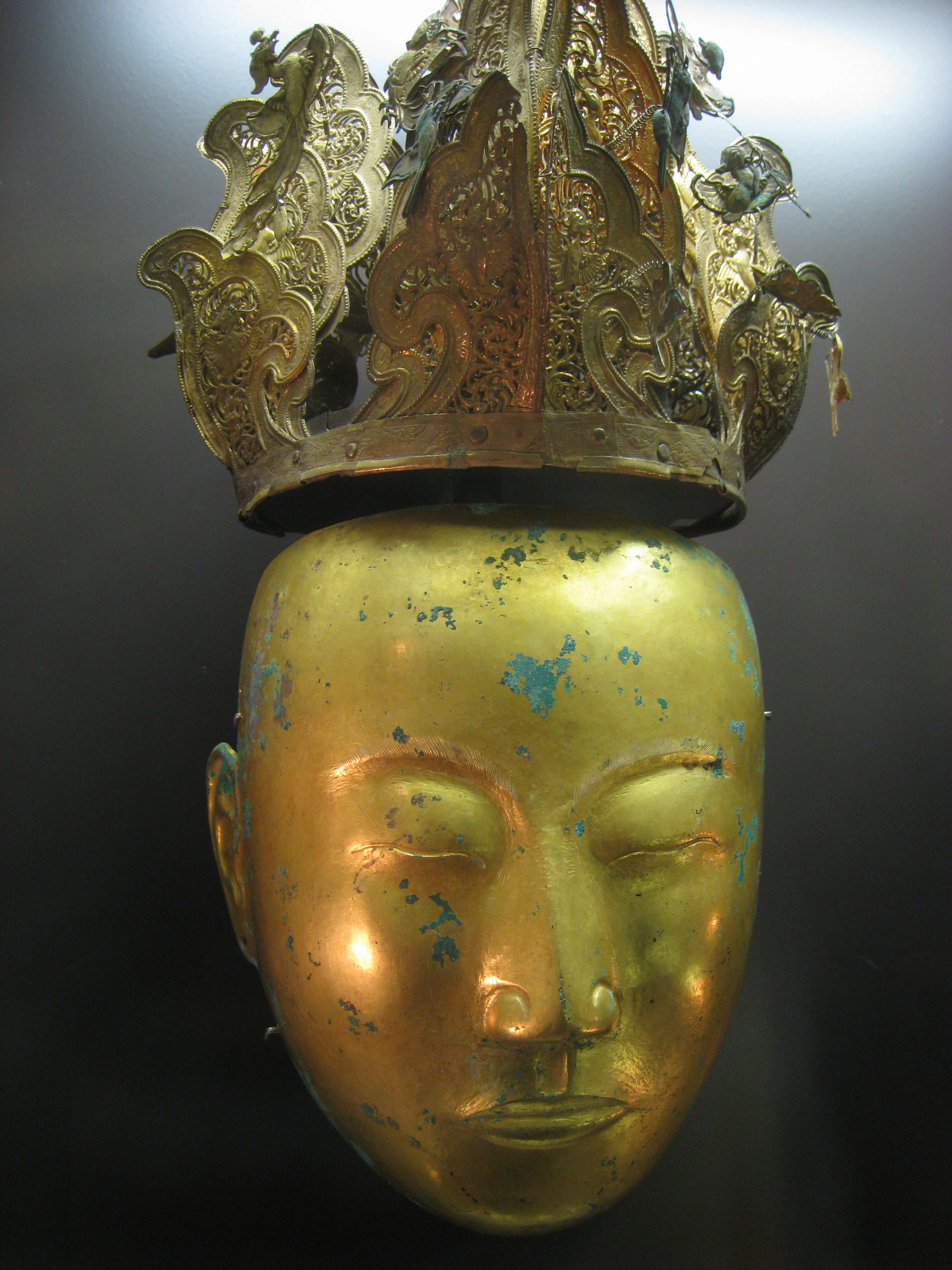
Liao dynasty funerary mask and crown

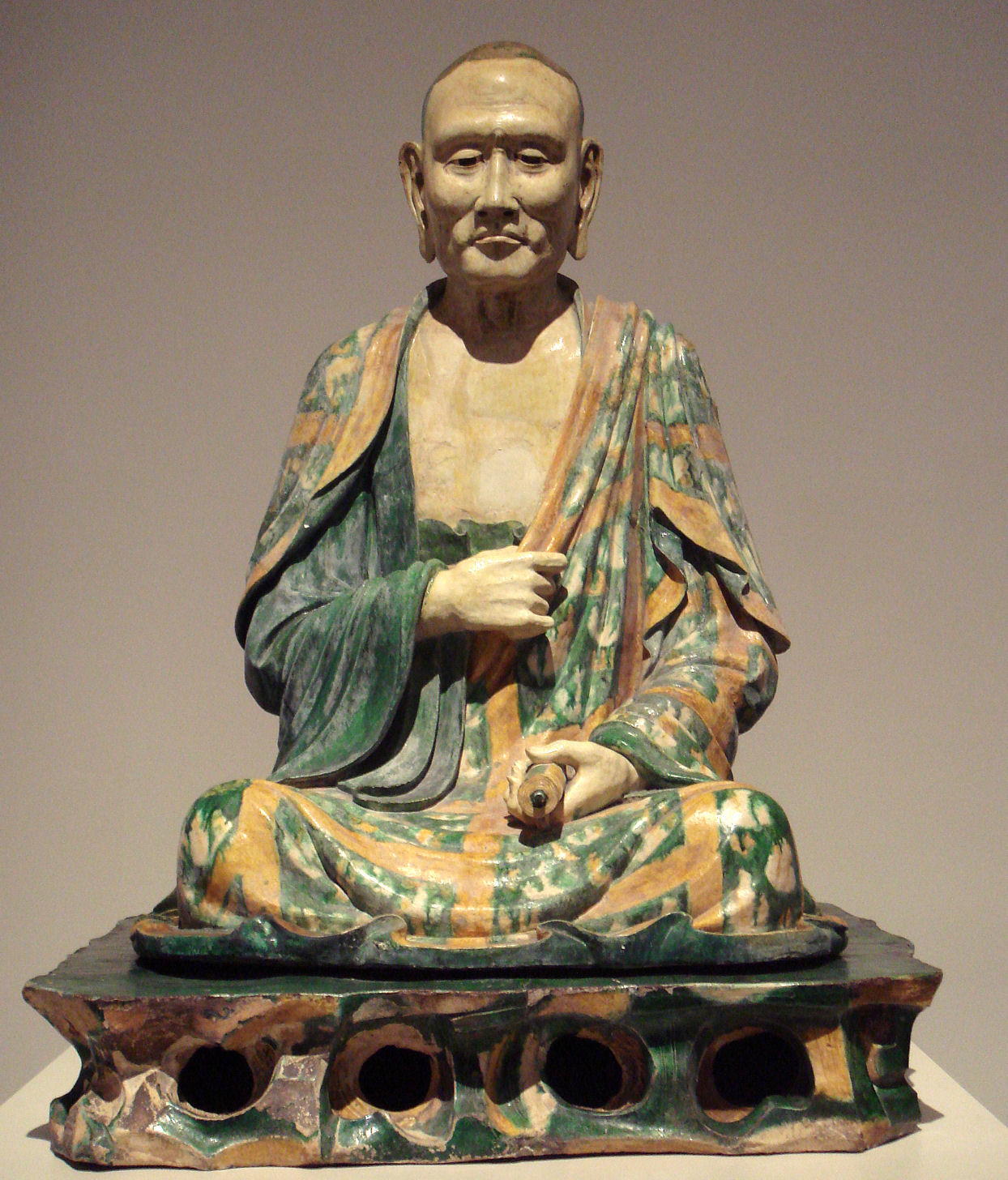
One of the Yixian glazed pottery luohans at the Metropolitan Museum of Art, created in the 12th century during the Liao dynasty.

== See also ==
- History of the Khitans
- List of Khitan rulers
- Yelü
- Liao dynasty
- Northern Liao
- Qara Khitai (Western Liao dynasty)
- Eastern Liao
- Later Liao
- Qutlugh-Khanids
- Cathay
- Mongol mythology
