= Liao =

Liao may refer to:

== Chinese history ==
- Liao (Zhou dynasty state) (蓼), two states in ancient China during the Spring and Autumn period in the 8th and 7th centuries BC
- Liao of Wu (吳王僚) (died 515 BC), king of Wu during ancient China's Spring and Autumn period
- Liao dynasty (遼朝) (916–1125), a dynasty of China ruled by the Khitan Yelü clan
  - Northern Liao (北遼) (1122–1123), a regime in northern China
  - Qara Khitai (西遼) (1124–1218), also called the "Western Liao", successor to the Liao dynasty in northwestern China and Central Asia
  - Eastern Liao (東遼) (1213–1269), a regime in northeastern China
  - Later Liao (後遼) (1216–1219), a regime in northeastern China

== Other uses ==
- Liaoning, abbreviated as Liao (辽), a province of China
- liao (料), a unit of displacement for Ming-era Chinese naval vessels
- Liao (surname) (廖), a Chinese family name
- Liao River, a river in northeast China
- liao, a grammatical particle in Singlish
- Liao, a character of the video game Overwatch
- House Liao, the noble house in the Battletech franchise that leads the major political power called the Capellan Confederation.
