= Ning (surname) =

Family name

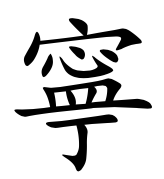
- Ning surname in regular script
- Romanization: Níng (Mandarin)
- Pronunciation: Níng (Pinyin)
- Language: Chinese

Origin
- Language: Old Chinese
- Meaning: "peaceful"

Other names
- Derivative: Ninh (Vietnamese)

Ning is the romanisation of the Chinese surnames 寧 Níng and its variant 甯 Nìng. After the introduction of simplified characters, both names were written as 宁 in mainland China until 2000, when the character 甯 was restored as an accepted variant for people whose family had originally used that character. However, usage of 甯 remains rare, with most continuing to use 宁.

As a first name, it is a name suitable for both genders, but more commonly masculine. Its literal meaning is "peaceful". The surname appears in the Hundred Family Surnames, but is relatively uncommon in modern times. In 2008, research by the Chinese Office of Public Security estimated that around 710,000 people in China shared the surname 宁, making it the 173rd most common surname in the People's Republic of China. Worldwide, the number of people with the surname Ning may be over 800,000.

== Chinese ==
The ancient origins of this surname are thought to begin with an official called Ji Wei in the era of the Zhou dynasty, who was given command over the county of Ningyi, which included the current regions of Huojia County and Xiuwu County in Henan. The descendants of Ji Wei adopted the geographical name of Ningyi as his surname in commemoration of his settlement.

The surname today appears in many areas of China, although there are a notable handful of towns in Guangxi which each have over 10,000 people surnamed Ning, specifically: Yandun, Taiping and Xinxu in Lingshan County, Xiaojian in Pubei County and Nalin in Bobai County.

== Ninh (Vietnamese) ==
The modern Vietnamese surname Ninh, derived from 寧 or 甯, has existed since at least the era of the Dinh dynasty, with historical mentions of a general called Ninh Huu Hung (939–1019), reputed to have overseen the construction of Hoa Lu, the ancient capital of Vietnam and seen by Vietnamese as the father of carpentry and wood carving.

== Notable people with the surname 宁/寧 ==
=== Ning (Chinese) ===
- Ning An (安宁; born 1976), Chinese-born American pianist
- Ning An (宁安; born 1995), Chinese professional footballer
- Ning Bin (宁滨; 1959–2019), Chinese control systems engineer and professor
- Ning Cheng (宁成), government official of the Han dynasty
- Ning Chunhong (宁春红; born 1968), Chinese chess player, Woman Grandmaster
- Ning Hao (宁浩; born 1977), Chinese film director
- James Ning (1936–2022), Chinese-American actor
- Ning Jing (宁静; born 1972), Chinese actress
- Ning Jizhe (宁吉喆; born 1956), Chinese economist and statistician
- Ning Menghua (宁梦华; born 1973), Chinese sprint canoeist
- Ning Qin (宁琴; born 1992), Chinese freestyle skier
- Ning Ying (宁瀛; born 1959), Chinese film director
- Ning Yizhuo (宁艺卓; born 2002), Chinese singer, member of girl group Aespa, known professionally as Ningning
- Ning Yuqing (宁宇清; born 1994), Chinese tennis player
- Ning Zetao (宁泽涛; born 1993), Chinese former competitive swimmer
- Ning Zhenyun (宁珍云; born 1982), Chinese professional footballer

=== Ninh (Vietnamese) ===
- Ninh Cát Loan Châu, Vietnamese American singer
- Ninh Dương Lan Ngọc, Vietnamese actress

== See also ==
- Ning (disambiguation)
- Nina (name)
- Niño (name)
- Nino (name)
