= Ning =

Ning may refer to:

== Places ==
- Ning County, county in Gansu, China
- Ning River, tributary of Mei River, originating and running through Xingning, China
- Ningxia, abbreviated as Ning, Hui autonomous region of China
- Nanjing, abbreviated as Ning, capital of Jiangsu Province, China

== Other uses ==
- Ning (surname), a Chinese surname
- Ning (website), an American online platform for people to create their own social networks
