= Eastern Liao =

Former East Asian country

Eastern Liao 東遼
- 1213–1269
- Capital: Zhongjing
- Government: Monarchy
- King
  - 1213–1220: Yelü Liuge
  - 1226–1238: Yelü Xuedu
  - 1238–1259: Yelü Shouguonu
  - 1259–1269: Yelü Gunai
- History
  - Yelü Liuge revolts against the Jin dynasty: 1212
  - Yelü Liuge becomes king: 1213
  - Later Liao splits from Eastern Liao: 1216
  - Disestablished: 1269
- Currency: Chinese cash, Chinese coin, copper coins etc.
Preceded by	Succeeded by
Jin dynasty (1115–1234)	Yuan dynasty
- Today part of: China

Eastern Liao (simplified Chinese: 东辽; traditional Chinese: 東遼; pinyin: Dōng Liáo) was a 13th-century kingdom in what is now Northeast China, established by the Khitan Yelü clan in an attempt to resurrect the Liao dynasty. Its capital was situated in modern-day Kaiyuan, Liaoning.

== Establishment ==
Yelü Liuge, a descendant of the Liao dynasty imperial clan, rebelled against the rule of the Jurchen-led Jin dynasty in 1212. Within several months, Yelü Liuge was able to build up a sizeable following. The Jin emperor Xuanzong appointed Wanyan Husha and Puxian Wannu to crush the rebellion, but Yelü Liuge subsequently defeated the Jin forces in modern Changtu, Liaoning with Mongol support.

In 1213, Yelü Liuge proclaimed himself king, adopted the dynastic name of "Liao" (Chinese: 遼) and era name of "Yuantong" (Chinese: 元統). To distinguish this regime from other similarly named realms in Chinese history, historians refer to this kingdom in retrospect as "Eastern Liao" (Chinese: 東遼).

In 1214, the Jin dynasty once again attacked Eastern Liao under the command of Puxian Wannu. After defeating the Jin forces the second time, Yelü Liuge established his capital at modern-day Kaiyuan, Liaoning and renamed it to "Zhongjing" (lit. "Middle Capital"; Chinese: 中京). Puxian Wannu himself rebelled against Jin and founded the Eastern Xia kingdom in Dongjing (Liaoyang) of Jin in 1215.

== Relations with Later Liao ==
In 1215, Yelü Liuge occupied the eastern capital of the Jin dynasty (modern Liaoyang, Liaoning). Soon after, Eastern Liao officials began to urge Yelü Liuge to assume the title of "emperor". Yelü Liuge declined and subsequently allied himself with Genghis Khan who had by this time united the Mongol tribes.

In 1216, Yelü Sibu (the younger brother of Yelü Liuge) rebelled against the pro-Mongol faction led by Yelü Liuge. Yelü Sibu proclaimed himself the emperor of a new regime, Later Liao (Chinese: 後遼), in modern Haicheng, Liaoning.

In 1218, Yelü Liuge attacked Later Liao with the support of the Mongol Empire and Goryeo. In the spring of 1219, the Later Liao ruler Yelü Hanshe committed suicide after suffering military defeat by Eastern Liao, marking the collapse of the Later Liao regime.

== Later history ==
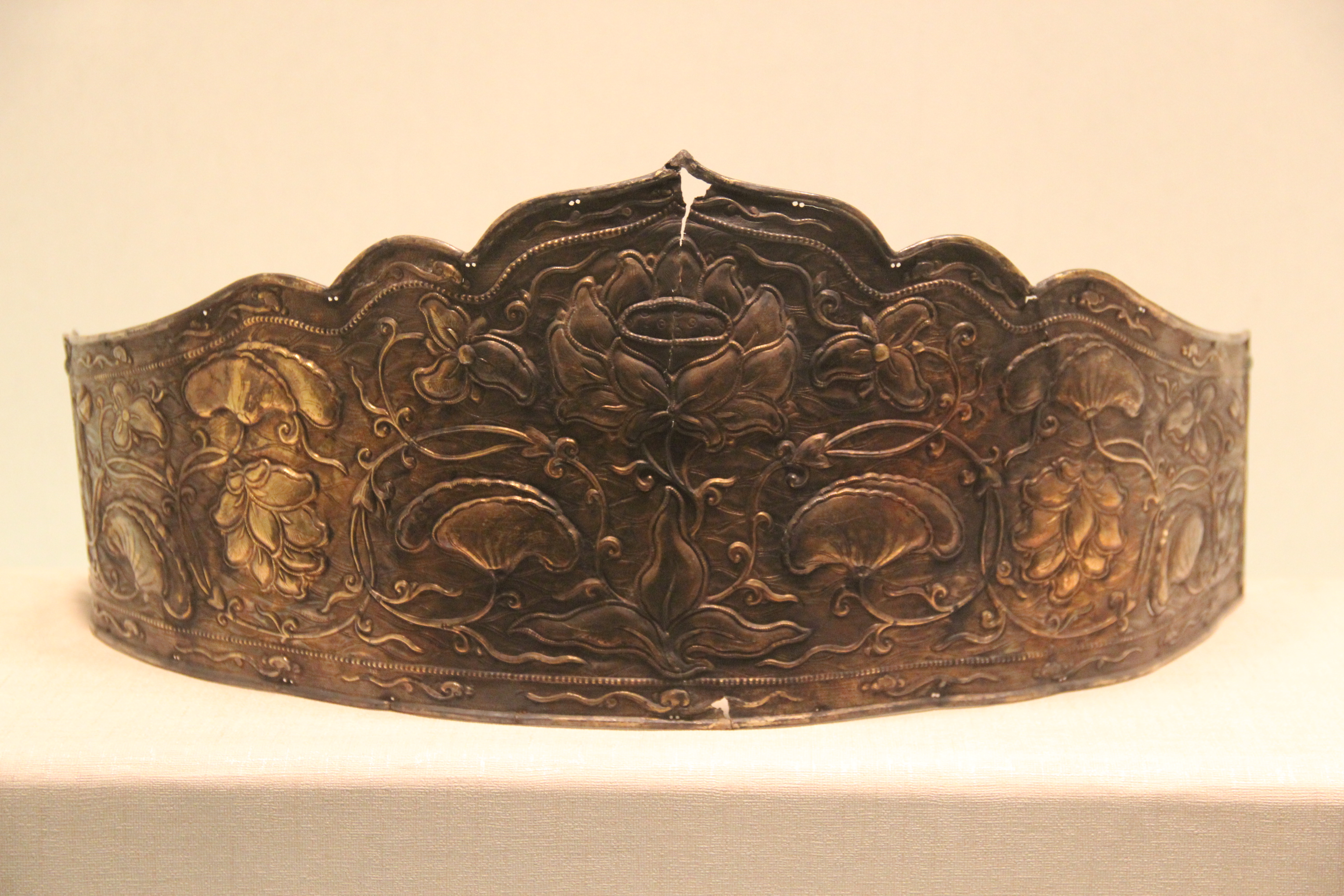
Khitan waist ornament

The kingdom then became a vassalage of the Mongol Empire. Yelü Liuge died in 1220. His son, Yelü Xuedu lived at the Mongol court and served in Genghis Khan's army. In 1269, the Yuan dynasty abolished the title, ending the Eastern Liao kingdom.

== Monarchs ==
Personal name	Era name	Reign	Reference
Yelü Liuge (耶律留哥)	Yuantong (元統)	1213–1220	
Empress Yaoli (姚里氏)^{1}		1220–1226	
Yelü Xuedu (耶律薛阇)		1226–1238	
Yelü Shouguonu (耶律收國奴)		1238–1259	
Yelü Gunai (耶律古乃)		1259–1269	
^{1} Regent

== See also ==
- Liao dynasty
- Northern Liao
- Western Liao
- Later Liao
