= Later Liao =

Later Liao 後遼
- 1216–1219
- Capital: Chengzhou
- Government: Monarchy
- Emperor, King
  - 1216: Yelü Sibu
  - 1216–1217: Yelü Jinshan
  - 1217–1218: Yelü Tongguyu
  - 1218–1219: Yelü Hanshe
- History
  - Yelü Liuge establishes Eastern Liao: 1213
  - Yelü Sibu declares himself emperor: 1216
  - Later Liao defeated by Eastern Liao: 1219
- Currency: Chinese cash, Chinese coin, copper coins etc.
Preceded by	Succeeded by
Eastern Liao	Eastern Liao
- Today part of: China

Later Liao (simplified Chinese: 后辽; traditional Chinese: 後遼; pinyin: Hòu Liáo) was a short-lived dynastic regime in Northeast China that existed between 1216 and 1219. It was ruled by the House of Yelü and was the last regime that sought to revive the Liao dynasty in China (the Eastern Liao had by this time become a vassal of the Mongol Empire).

== History ==
In 1213, Yelü Liuge proclaimed the Eastern Liao after rebelling against the Jin dynasty. His pro-Mongol policy caused a split within the Eastern Liao court, eventually resulting in Yelü Sibu (the younger brother of Yelü Liuge) declaring himself emperor of an independent regime with the official dynastic title "Liao" (Chinese: 遼), known in retrospect as "Later Liao" (Chinese: 後遼). Not long after proclaiming himself emperor, Yelü Sibu was killed. The premier Yelü Qinu was made regent.

After suffering military defeat by the Jin dynasty, Yelü Qinu escaped and was subsequently killed by Yelü Jinshan. Yelü Jinshan ascended to the Later Liao throne in Goryeo. In 1217, Goryeo forces defeated Yelü Jinshan and forced him to abscond.

Yelü Jinshan's successor, Yelü Tong'guyu, was killed by Yelü Hanshe not long after becoming the ruler of Later Liao. As infighting erupted within Later Liao, an allied forces of Eastern Liao, the Mongol Empire and Goryeo encircled Later Liao. In 1219, Yelü Hanshe committed suicide in the aftermath of Later Liao's defeat, marking the end of the short-lived dynasty. The territories once held by Later Liao were re-incorporated into Eastern Liao.

== Monarchs ==
The only Later Liao monarch to use the title of emperor was Yelü Sibu. All subsequent rulers assumed the title of king.

Personal name	Era name	Reign	Reference
Yelü Sibu (耶律廝不)	Tianwei (天威)	1216	
Yelü Qinu (耶律乞奴)^{1}	Tianyou (天佑)	1216	
Yelü Jinshan (耶律金山)	Tiande (天德)	1216–1217	
Yelü Tongguyu (耶律統古與)		1217–1218	
Yelü Hanshe (耶律喊舍)		1218–1219	
^{1} Regent
