= 1223 =

1223 in various calendars
Gregorian calendar	1223; MCCXXIII
Ab urbe condita	1976
Armenian calendar	672; ԹՎ ՈՀԲ
Assyrian calendar	5973
Balinese saka calendar	1144–1145
Bengali calendar	629–630
Berber calendar	2173
English Regnal year	7 Hen. 3 – 8 Hen. 3
Buddhist calendar	1767
Burmese calendar	585
Byzantine calendar	6731–6732
Chinese calendar	壬午年 (Water Horse); 3920 or 3713 — to — 癸未年 (Water Goat); 3921 or 3714
Coptic calendar	939–940
Discordian calendar	2389
Ethiopian calendar	1215–1216
Hebrew calendar	4983–4984
- Hindu calendars
Vikram Samvat	1279–1280
Shaka Samvat	1144–1145
Kali Yuga	4323–4324
Holocene calendar	11223
Igbo calendar	223–224
Iranian calendar	601–602
Islamic calendar	619–620
Japanese calendar	Jōō 2 (貞応２年)
Javanese calendar	1131–1132
Julian calendar	1223; MCCXXIII
Korean calendar	3556
Minguo calendar	689 before ROC 民前689年
Nanakshahi calendar	−245
Thai solar calendar	1765–1766
Tibetan calendar	ཆུ་ཕོ་རྟ་ལོ་ (male Water-Horse); 1349 or 968 or 196 — to — ཆུ་མོ་ལུག་ལོ་ (female Water-Sheep); 1350 or 969 or 197

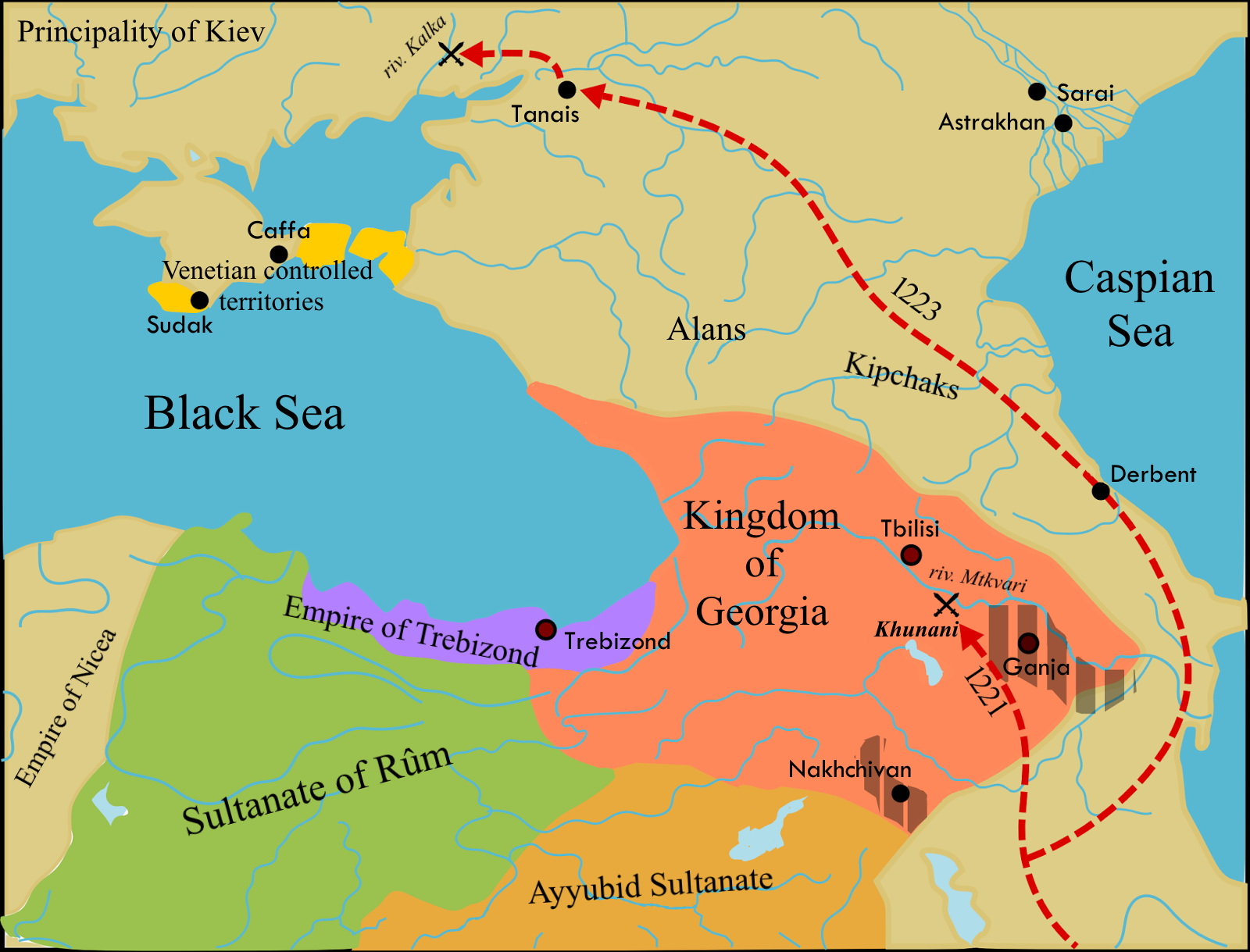
The Mongol invasion of Georgia and the attacks on surrounding countries.

Year 1223 (MCCXXIII) was a common year starting on Sunday of the Julian calendar.

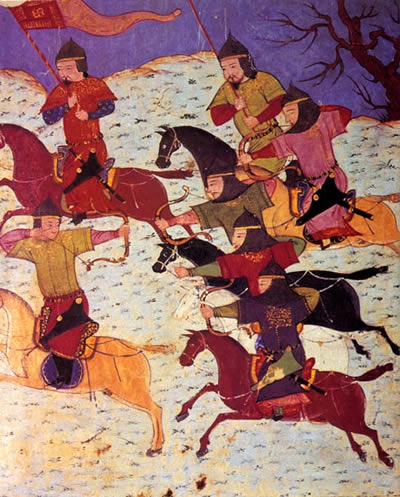
Mongol horse archers during battle

== Events ==
=== January–March ===
- January 4 – Germanus II takes office as Patriarch of Constantinople, leader of the Eastern Orthodox Church, after moving the patriarchate's capital 56 miles (90 km) from Constantinople (now Istanbul) to Nicaea (now Iznik in Turkey), as the guest of John III Doukas Vatatzes, Emperor of Nicaea.
- January 18
  - Rusudan becomes the new Queen of Georgia after her brother, King George IV, dies of injuries received four months earlier in the Battle of Khunan against the Mongols.
  - After a failed attempt on December 28, the Mongol General Muqali leads a second attack on the Chinese fortress of Fengxiang and fails.
- January 29 – Battle of Viljandi: During a church service, the Sakalians attack the Germans inside the stronghold of Viljandi Castle. The Estonian forces kill members of the Livonian Brothers of the Sword and many merchants.
- February 2 – Ireland enjoys its first dry day in almost five months, as rains that had started on September 14 halt by the celebration of the Purification of St. Mary, as noted by The Annals of Loch Se.
- February 6 – Dispatched by Genghis Khan, the Mongol General Muqali makes a third and final attempt to capture Fengxiang, but fails again, ending the Mongol attempts.
- March 23 – At a meeting in Ferentino at the imperial villa of the Papal States, Pope Honorius III hosts a meeting with the newly-widowed Frederick II, Holy Roman Emperor; John I, King of Jerusalem; Patriarch Raoul of Mérencourt; and papal legate Pelagius Galvani to prepare for the Sixth Crusade by European Christians against the Muslims of the Middle East. Frederick agrees to lead the crusade in return for being able to marry John's daughter, Yolande of Brienne.
- March 25 – Sancho II "the Pious" becomes the new King of Portugal upon the death of his father, King Afonso II "the Fat".

=== April–June ===
- April 13 – Pope Honorius III issues a papal bull relaxing the strict rules that had applied to monks of the Valliscaulian Order.
- April 14 – On the island of Sri Lanka, King Chodaganga Deva lands at Trincomalee on the Tamil New Year's Day (the 1st of Chittirai of Shaka era year 1145) and makes a large donation to fund the Hindu Koneswaram Temple. The event is commemorated in an inscription in the Sanskrit language in the temple.
- May 7 – Henry I, Count of Schwerin, kidnaps the King of Denmark, Valdemar II and the king's 14-year-old son, Valdemar the Young, after landing with a group of soldiers on the island of Lyø, where King Valdemar had been hunting. King Valdemar will be held captive for three years until Easter Sunday of 1226, and released after payment of 44,000 silver marks and the surrendering of lands taken 20 years earlier in Holstein.
- May 15 – The Russian army gathers on the island of Khortytsia, later to become a famous Cossack base, at the mouth of the Dnieper River, next to modern-day Zaporizhzhia (Ukraine). The main Polovtsian forces led by Köten Khan, join the Russians here, which consist entirely of mounted archers. Compared to this, some 20,000–25,000 Mongols assemble and build a defensive encampment on the high ground, probably on the northern slopes of the Mohila Bel'mak hills, located near the Konka River.
- May 16 – Mstislav Mstislavich leads a small detachment of his own men, and some Polovtsians to the far bank of the Dnieper River – where they attack a part of the Mongol advance guard. The Mongols promptly fleeing into the steppes. Mstislavich pursues them and captures their commander named Gemyabek or Hamabek who seeks refuge behind a wooden fence surrounding a Polovtsian burial site. The captive's fate is sealed when the Polovtsians ask Mstislavich to hand him over – to execute.
- May 17 – Daniel of Galicia leads a reconnaissance in force east of the Dnieper River, using a bridge of boats. He defeats a Mongol detachment, who abandons their herds and local prisoners. Following these successful sorties, the entire Russian and Polovtsian armies start a 9 day march towards the main Mongol army. Numerous carts move across the steppes, loaded with mail, heavy armour, as well as shields, protected by Russian cavalry. The Mongol forces retreat towards the Kalka River.
- May 31 – Battle of the Kalka River: The Russian cavalry successfully attacks the Mongol vanguard and crosses the Kalka River in what is now Ukraine. The Polovtsian and Volhynian cavalry led by Daniel of Galicia form the Russian vanguard. Meanwhile, the army of Kiev waits on the western side of the Kalka River. The Russians fail to co-ordinate their attacks, they advance in separate formations and become divided by the Kalka River. In the afternoon, the Russian army collapses under continuous Mongol attacks.
- June 16 – The Mongol General Subutai withdraws eastward after the victory at the Battle of the Kalka River, after General Jebe has died.

=== July–September ===
- July 14 – Philip II, King of France dies of a fever while traveling to Paris. He is succeeded by his son Louis "the Lion", who takes the name King Louis VIII.
- August 6 – The coronation of King Louis VIII of France takes place at the Reims Cathedral.
- August 10 – The Order of the Blessed Virgin Mary of Mercy, whose followers are called the Mercedarians, is legally constituted in Barcelona by King James I of Aragon. It will receive papal approval 12 years later.
- Pope Honorius III gives his legate to France, Conrad d'Urach, free authority to negotiate a peace with Raymond VII, Count of Toulouse, in France.
- September 29 – King James I of Aragon halts the minting of new coins for the next seven years in order to prevent the devaluation of the kingdom's medium of exchange.

=== October–December ===
- October 8 – At Montgomery in Wales, King Henry III of England reaches a peaceful settlement with Llywelyn ab Iorwerth, the powerful ruler of the semi-independent Principality of Gwynedd, following a mediation by Ranulf de Blondeville, the Earl of Chester.
- October 20 – Otto I, Duke of Merania, issues five charters for lavish donations to religious communities.
- November 1 – King Louis VIII of France issues an ordinance prohibiting the kingdom's officials from registering debts owed to Jewish moneylenders, and limiting the lenders to a recovery of the principal amount owed, without interest.
- November 29 – Pope Honorius III approves the Franciscan Rule (also called "Regula Bullata"). The rule sets regulations for discipline, preaching, and entering the order for Franciscan friars.
- December 24 – Father Francis of Assisi (Giovanni di Pietro di Bernardone), founder of the Order of the Franciscans with in the Roman Catholic Church, begins the tradition of celebrating Christmas with a nativity scene. Having received permission from Pope Honorius III, Francis arranges for a display in a cave near the Italian city of Greccio, with the representation of the events associated with the birth of Jesus Christ as described in the Gospel of Matthew and in the Gospel of Luke, using real people and animals.

=== Other events, by place ===
==== Mongol Empire ====
- Spring – The Polovtsian army assembles on the Terek River lowlands and are joined by Alan, Circassian, and Don Kipchak/Cuman forces. The Mongol army crosses the Caucasus Mountains, but is trapped in the narrow mountain passes. The Mongol generals Subutai and Jebe (the Arrow) send an embassy to the Polovtsians and convince them to break their alliance with the Caucasian peoples. The Mongol cavalry invades the Caucasus region and devastates the local villages, seizing slaves, cattle and horses.
- The Mongol army invades Polovtsian territory and defeats the Polovtsians in a great battle near the Don River. Several Polovtsian leaders are killed – while the remainder flees westwards, across the Dnieper River, to seek support by various Russian princes. Steppe lands east of the Dnieper fall under Mongol control, Subutai and Jebe raise the wealthy city of Astrakhan on the Volga River. Subutai now parts his forces, he moves south to the Crimea (or Tauric Peninsula), while Jebe travels towards the Dnieper.
- Mongol forces capture the nominally Genoese trading outpost of Sudak, probably with the tacit approval of neighbouring rival Venetian outposts in the Crimea. Subutai promises to destroy any non-Venetian colonies in the area. In return, the Venetians provide Subutai with information about the kingdoms in Eastern Europe. Meanwhile, Köten Khan, Cuman/Kipchak chieftain of the Polovtsians, convinces Prince Mstislav Mstislavich of Galicia to form an alliance, and informs him of his plight against the Mongols.
- February – A council of Russian princes summons at Kiev; several princes are convinced by Köten Khan to assemble an allied army to drive the Mongols back. During the first half of March, Russian princes return to their principalities and begin to raise forces for the forthcoming campaign. The alliance has a combined force of some 60,000 men, mainly cavalry. Subutai unites his army with Jebe, and sends ambassadors to the Kievan Rus' princes, to tell them to stay out of the conflict as it didn't involve them.
- April – The Russian princes lead their separate armies from different parts of Russia, to assemble 60 kilometres downriver from Kiev. There are three main groups of princes taking part in the campaign; the Kievan army is represented by Grand Prince Mstislav Romanovich (the Old). The second group are the Chernigov and Smolensk armies under Prince Mstislav II. The third group is the Galician-Volhynian army under Mstislav Mstislavich with his son-in-law Daniel of Galicia, leaving from northern Ukraine.
- The Mongol leaders Subutai and Jebe receive news that Jochi, who camps north of the Caspian Sea, will not be able to provide the expected reinforcements due to Jochi's reported illness or suspected refusal to obey his father Genghis Khan's orders. Subutai sends an embassy to the Russian princes, to offer peace and perhaps attempt to break the Russian alliance with the Polovtsians. But the Mongol ambassadors are executed – a task eagerly carried out by Köten Khan's followers, by the end of April.
- Late April – The Russian and Polovtsian armies march down the west bank of the Dnieper River. Within a few days of the march beginning, a second group of Mongol ambassadors appear in the Russian camp and again offer peace. When their offers are rebuffed, the ambassadors are allowed to leave unharmed. Meanwhile, Russian forces from Galicia arrive by boat or cart-loads of equipment and food, along the Black Sea coast and up the Dnieper River, screened by Mongol forces on the east bank.
- Late May – The Mongol army under Subutai and Jebe establishes a defensive position on the Kalka River. Increasing disagreements amongst the Russian princes, about the wisdom of continuing to pursue the Mongols deeper into the steppes. By the end of May, the allied forces reach the banks of the Kalka River. The Polovtsian vanguard is way ahead of the rest of the Russian army, which gives them a triumphant feeling. Meanwhile, Subutai and Jebe set up a trap against the Russian forces.
- June – Mstislav Mstislavich escapes back to the Dnieper River with the remnants of his Galician army. Mstislav Romanovich (the Old) surrenders and is executed. According to sources, he and other Russian nobles are slowly suffocated to death during a Mongol 'drunken feast', they are tied up and laid flat on the ground beneath what is described as a wooden 'bridge' (or platform), on which Subutai, Jebe and their officers feast. This is revenge for killing the Mongol ambassadors.
- Battle of Samara Bend: A Volga-Bulgarian army under Ghabdula Chelbir defeats the Mongols, probably led by Subutai, Jebe and Jochi. The Bulgars retreat during the battle but the Mongols pursue them. Then the main Bulgar forces ambush the Mongols. Subutai and Jebe retreat their forces near the city of Sarai (future capital of the Golden Horde), not far from where the Volga River empties into the Caspian Sea.
- Autumn – Mongol forces under Jochi, Subutai and Jebe attack and defeat the Qangl Turks (eastern Kipchaks or Wild Polovtsians), killing their ruler. During the winter, they continue eastwards across the Great Steppe. Jebe (possibly poisoned) suddenly dies of a fever near the Imil River.

==== Europe ====
- Livonian Crusade: The Estonians revolt against the Livonian Brothers of the Sword and Denmark, and for a brief period reconquer all of their strongholds except for Tallinn.

==== Asia ====
- Spring – The Mongol army led by Muqali (or Mukhali) strikes into Shaanxi Province, attacking Chang'an while Genghis khan is invading the Khwarazmian Empire. The garrison (some 200,000 men) in Chang'an is too strong and Muqali is forced to pillage Feng County. During the campaign, Muqali becomes seriously ill and dies, while his forces are consolidating their position on both sides of the Yellow River.

== Births ==
- January 25 – Maud de Lacy, English noblewoman (d. 1289)
- Baibars, Mamluk sultan of Egypt and Syria (d. 1277)
- Eleanor of Provence, queen of England (d. 1291)
- Frederick of Castile, Spanish nobleman (d. 1277)
- Guido I da Montefeltro, Italian nobleman (d. 1298)
- Hugh le Despencer, English nobleman (d. 1265)
- Ibn Abd al-Zahir, Egyptian historian (d. 1293)
- Ichijō Sanetsune, Japanese nobleman (d. 1284)
- John Fitzalan II, English nobleman (d. 1267)
- Llywelyn ap Gruffudd, prince of Wales (d. 1282)
- Michael VIII (Palaiologos), Byzantine emperor (d. 1282)
- Mugai Nyodai, Japanese Zen Master (d. 1298)
- Stefan Uroš I (the Great), king of Serbia (d. 1277)

== Deaths ==
- March 8 – Wincenty Kadłubek, bishop of Kraków (b. 1150)
- March 25 – Afonso II (the Fat), king of Portugal (b. 1185)
- May 31 – Mstislav Svyatoslavich, Kievan prince (b. 1168)
- June 4 – Hugh of Beaulieu, English abbot and bishop
- July 7 – Ibn Qudamah, Umayyad theologian (b. 1147)
- July 8 – Konoe Motomichi, Japanese nobleman (b. 1160)
- July 14 – Philip II (Augustus), king of France (b. 1165)
- Alamanda de Castelnau, French troubadour and writer
- Fernán Gutiérrez de Castro, Spanish nobleman (b. 1180)
- Gerald of Wales, Norman archdeacon and writer (b. 1146)
- Gille Brigte of Strathearn, Scottish nobleman (b. 1150)
- Henry I (the Elder), German nobleman and knight (b. 1158)
- Ibn Tumlus, Andalusian scholar and physician (b. 1164)
- Jebe (the Arrow), Mongol general (approximate date)
- Mstislav Romanovich (the Old), Grand Prince of Kiev
- Muqali (or Mukhulai), Mongol military leader (b. 1170)
- Sancho (or Sanche), Aragonese nobleman (b. 1161)
- Unkei, Japanese Buddhist monk and sculptor (b. 1150)
- William de Cornhill, English archdeacon and bishop
- Ye Shi, Chinese philosopher and politician (b. 1150)
