= Uriyangkhadai =

Mongol general during the Yuan dynasty

- ᠤᠷᠢᠶᠠᠩᠬᠠᠳᠠᠢ
- Born: 1201
- Died: 1272 (aged 70–71)
- Other names: Latin transcriptions: Uriyankhadai, Uriyangqadai, Uriyanqadai, Ouriyangkhataï
- Occupation: General
- Children: Aju
- Father: Subutai
- Relatives: Jelme (uncle)

Uriyangkhadai (Modern Mongolian: Mongolian Cyrillic: Урианхадай, [uriɑŋ.xɑˈdæ], Chinese: 兀良哈台; pinyin: Wùliánghātái, c. 1201 – c. 1272) was an Uriankhai general in the Mongol Empire who led several campaigns during the 13th century Mongol conquest of the Song dynasty in China, as well as the first Mongol invasion of Vietnam. He was the son of military strategist Subutai and father of Mongol general and chancellor Aju.

== Early life and campaigns in Europe ==
Uriyangkhadai was born to Mongol general Subutai and was named after the Uriankhai, their tribe of origin. He was a nephew of Jelme. A folk legend claimed that Subutai wished to die by his son Uriyangkhadai by the banks of the Danube river.

By 1241, Uriyangkhadai had become an accomplished general in the Mongol invasion of Eastern Europe. According to Jean-Pierre Abel-Rémusat, he participated in the conquest of Kievan Rus', conquest of Poland, and conquests of Germanic lands before being sent to China.

== Campaigns in China and Vietnam ==
=== Invasion of Yunnan and Tibet ===
During the first phase of the Mongol conquest of the Song dynasty in southern China, Uriyangkhadai led 3,000 Mongol cavalry in Sichuan. Uriyangkhadai led successful campaigns in the southwest of China against the Dali Kingdom alongside Kublai Khan and pacified tribes in Tibet after Kublai Khan's return to northern China, before turning east towards the kingdom of Đại Việt under the Trần dynasty by winter 1257. Uriyangkhadai had significantly more military experience than Kublai Khan and proved invaluable in battle.

=== Invasion of Vietnam ===
In the autumn of 1257, Uriyangkhadai addressed three letters to the Vietnamese monarch Trần Thái Tông demanding passage through to southern China. After the three successive envoys were imprisoned in Thang Long (modern-day Hanoi), the capital of the northern Vietnamese kingdom of Dai Viet, Uriyangkhadai invaded Đại Việt with generals Trechecdu and Aju in the rear. According to Vietnamese sources, the Mongol army consisted of at least 30,000 soldiers of which at least 2,000 were Yi troops from the Dali Kingdom while Western sources estimate that the Mongol army consisted of about 3,000 Mongols with an additional 10,000 Yi soldiers. In 1258, Uriyangkhadai successfully captured Thang Long. While Chinese source material incorrectly stated that Uriyangkhadai withdrew from Vietnam after nine days due to poor climate, his forces did not leave until 1259.

=== Invasion of Guangxi and Hunan ===
Uriyangkhadai left Thang Long in 1259 to invade the Song dynasty in modern-day Guangxi as part of a coordinated Mongol attack with armies attacking in Sichuan under Möngke Khan and other Mongol armies attacking in modern-day Shandong and Henan. Around 17 November 1259 while besieging Ezhou in Hubei, Kublai Khan received a messenger who described Uriyangkhadai's army advances from Thang Long to Tanzhou (modern-day Changsha) in Hunan via Yongzhou (modern-day Nanning) and Guilin in Guangxi. Uriyangkhada's army subsequently fought its way north to rejoin Kublai Khan's army on the northern banks of the Yangtze river, after which both armies returned to northern China due to the succession crisis that emerged as a result of Möngke Khan's death at the Siege of Diaoyucheng on 11 August 1259.
