= Aju =

Mongol general in Yuan dynasty China

- Born: 1227
- Died: 1287 (aged 59–60)
- Relatives: Uriyangkhadai (father); Subutai (grandfather); Jelme (great-uncle)
- Military career
- Allegiance: Yuan China
- Rank: General
- Conflicts: Battle of Xiangyang
- Other work: Chancellor

Aju (or Achu; Khalkha Mongolian: Ажу; Chinese: 阿朮) (1227–1287) was a general and chancellor of the Mongol Empire and the Yuan dynasty. He was from the Jarchud clan of the Mongol Uriankhai. His father was Yuan dynasty general Uriyangkhadai and his grandfather was Subutai, the honored general and Noyan of Genghis Khan.

== Biography ==
In 1253 he followed his father and conquered the Kingdom of Dali. Uriyangkhadai and Aju led 3,000 Mongols and more than 10,000 troops from Dali tribes to invade northern Vietnam 1258. Although capturing Vietnamese capital of Thang Long (now Hanoi), his forces withdrew after his defeat in open battle against the Vietnamese Trần army. This arrangement lasted until the reign of Kublai Khan.

He and his father supported the forces of Möngke Khan and Kublai Khan in 1258. Aju commanded a tumen of 10,000 men. They conquered 13 cities within 2 years and destroyed 40,000 troops of the Song dynasty while his father was ill. After the occupation of Chingzhoua and Yovajiyu, Uryankhadai met prince Kublai at Echjou.

When Kublai succeeded the throne in 1260, Aju stayed in his palace. The following year, he was ordered to lead Yuan troops in Lianshui (涟水). He crushed Song armies and navies from 1261 to 1275. He captured Fancheng (樊城) by using Khotan artillery during the Battle of Xiangyang and its governor committed suicide. In 1276, Aju was appointed to defend Beshbalik from Kaidu, a grandson of Ögedei. He died after the defeat of Prince Sarban, who revolted against his master Kublai, in 1287. But some sources mention he died en route in 1286.
