= Battle of the Kalka River =

1223 battle where the Mongols fought against Rus' princes and Cumans

Battle of Kalka River
- Part of the Mongol invasion of Kievan Rus'
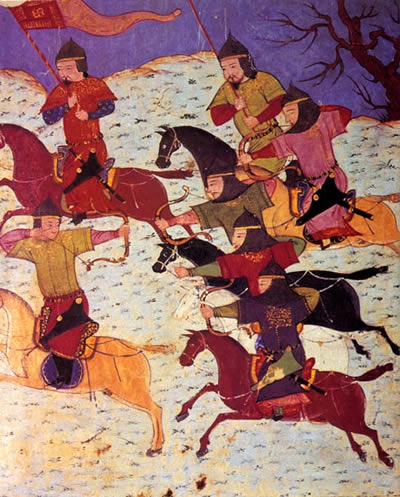
- Mongol horse archers
Date	31 May 1223
Location	Kalka River (now Ukraine) 47°15′03″N 37°29′44″E
Result	Mongol victory

Belligerents
Mongol Empire; Brodnici	Principality of Kiev; Principality of Galicia-Volhynia; Principality of Chernigov; Principality of Smolensk; Cumans; Black Klobuks

Commanders and leaders
Jebe; Subutai; Ploscânea	Mstislav Mstislavich; Mstislav III (POW) (executed); Daniel of Galicia (WIA); Mstislav II Svyatoslavich †; Khan Köten

Strength
~23,000–25,000 total ~18,000–20,000 Mongols; 3,000–5,000 Brodnici	~20,000–45,000 (modern estimates) up to 80,000 (historical claims); Modern Russian estimate: greater than 25,000 or >30,000 men (Note: 20,000–30,000 Russian warriors, plus an unknown number of Cumans and Black Klobuks.)

Casualties and losses
Minor; Minimal (modern estimates)	up to 70,000–75,000 dead, wounded, captured, missing, deserted, or executed Only every tenth person returned to Rus'.

The Battle of the Kalka River (Note: Russian: Битва на реке Калке; Ukrainian: Битва на річці Калка) was fought between the Mongol Empire, whose armies were led by Jebe and Subutai, and a coalition of several Rus' principalities, including Kiev and Galicia-Volhynia, and the Cumans under Köten. They were under the joint command of Mstislav the Bold and Mstislav III of Kiev. The battle was fought on May 31, 1223 on the banks of the Kalka River in present-day Donetsk Oblast, Ukraine, and ended in a decisive Mongol victory.

Following the Mongol invasion of Central Asia and the subsequent collapse of the Khwarezmian Empire, a Mongol force under the command of prominent Mongol Noyans (generals) Jebe and Subutai advanced into Iraq-i Ajam. Jebe requested permission from the Mongol emperor, Genghis Khan, to continue his conquests for a few years before returning to the main army via the Caucasus. While waiting for Genghis Khan's reply, the duo set out on a raid in which they attacked the Kingdom of Georgia. Genghis Khan granted the duo permission to undertake their expedition, and after making their way through the Caucasus, they defeated a coalition of Caucasian tribes before defeating the Cumans. The Cuman Khan fled to the court of his son-in-law, Mstislav Mstislavich of Galicia, whom he convinced to help fight the Mongols. Mstislav the Bold formed an alliance of the Rus' princes including Mstislav III of Kiev.

The combined Rus' army defeated the Mongol rearguard at first. The Rus' pursued the Mongols, who were in a feigned retreat, for several days, which spread out their armies. The Mongols stopped and assumed battle formation on the banks of the Kalka River. Mstislav the Bold and his Cuman allies attacked the Mongols without waiting for the rest of the Rus' army and were defeated. In the ensuing confusion, several other Rus' princes were defeated, and Mstislav of Kiev was forced to retreat to a fortified camp. After holding out for three days, he surrendered in return for a promise of safe conduct for himself and his men. Once they surrendered, however, the Mongols slaughtered them and executed Mstislav of Kiev. Mstislav the Bold escaped, and the Mongols went back to Asia, where they joined Genghis Khan.

== Background ==
In 1219, in retaliation for the murders of his ambassadors, the Mongol Khan, Genghis Khan, invaded the Khwarezmian Empire. In a campaign that lasted three years, Genghis Khan and his generals destroyed the Khwarezmian armies and caused the empire to disintegrate. The Khwarezmian Sultan Ala ad-Din Muhammad succumbed to disease on an island in the Caspian Sea, leaving his son, Jalal al-Din Mangburni landless.

When Jebe (one of the Mongol generals pursuing Muhammad) heard of Ala ad-Din Muhammad's death, he asked Genghis Khan for a year or two to continue his conquests before returning to Mongolia via the Caucasus.

While awaiting Genghis' reply, Jebe and Subutai (another general pursuing Muhammad) led their army of 20,000 men, with each general commanding a tumen. They left behind a trail of destruction as they moved through Persian Iraq (Iraq-i Ajam) and Azerbaijan, sacking the cities of Rey, Zanjan and Qazvin. The city of Hamadan surrendered without a struggle. Meanwhile, Özbeg, the Atabeg of Azerbaijan, saved his capital, Tabriz, and prevented his country's destruction by offering to the Mongols a large amount of money, clothing and horses, which were the Mongols' best weapons.

From Tabriz, the Mongols advanced north and made their winter base in the Mugan Steppes. There, the army was strengthened by the arrival of Kurdish and Turcoman freebooters, who offered their services to the Mongols.

=== Caucasus raid ===
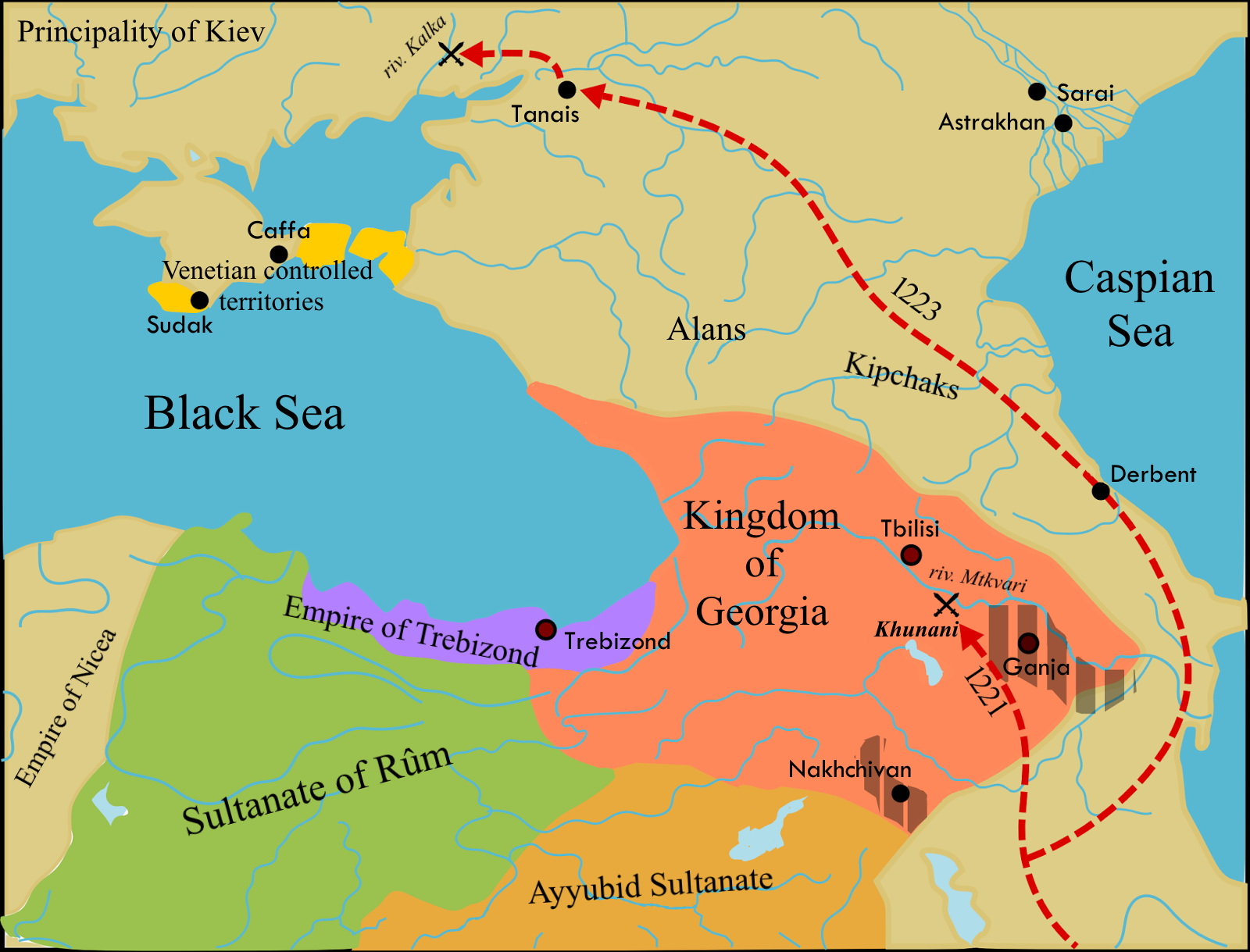
Mongol invasion of Georgia and Battle of Khunan in 1221.

At the same time, Jebe's and Subutai's attention had turned elsewhere. In January and February 1221, they made a reconnaissance into the Kingdom of Georgia, entering through the Kura River. The goal of the Mongols was not to conquer the country but to plunder it, and the Kurds and Turcoman freebooters were sent off in the vanguard. However, the King of Georgia, George IV Lasha, advanced with 10,000 men and drove the Mongols back near Tbilisi. The Mongols withdrew, but continued to launch counter-attacks on the Georgian army.

In March 1221, the Mongols returned to Azerbaijan and besieged Maragheh, using prisoners as the vanguard to take the brunt of each assault on the city. By the end of the month, they had captured the city and put most of the population to death. Jebe and Subutai planned to advance south and capture Baghdad, the capital of the Abbasid Caliphate, and hold it for ransom while the Caliph was in Iraq-i Ajam with a small army. Instead, the Mongols turned once again to Hamadan. This time, however, the city's leaders failed to surrender, and its defenders inflicted many casualties upon the Mongol forces before the Mongols captured and plundered the city.

In late 1221, the Mongols advanced north into Georgia once again, entering through the Kura River. A 30,000 men strong Georgian-Armenian army was assembled near Tbilisi. The Mongols were also reinforced, numbering 30,000 and received further support from local Turkmen tribes. Jebe set up an ambush with 5,000 men while the main Mongol army feigned retreat. The Georgian cavalry pursued Subutai's army after defeating the Turkmen and were destroyed when Jebe closed the trap. The Georgian army suffered a heavy defeat at Khunan, and King George was mortally wounded. The Mongols proceeded to plunder southern Georgia.

== Prelude ==
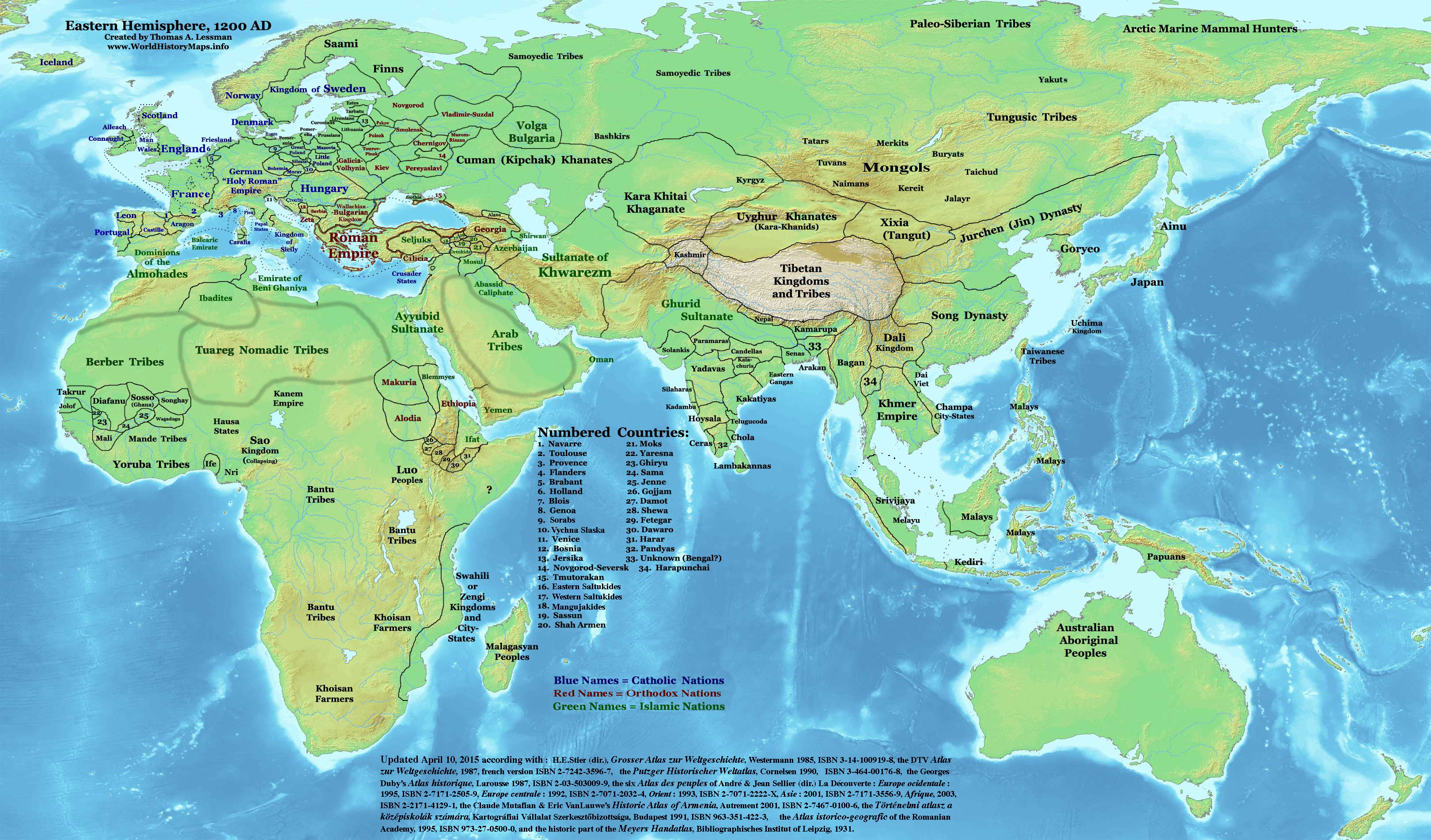
A map showing the Cuman Khanate and the Rus principalities

Genghis Khan eventually granted Jebe permission and with Subutai as his second-in-command, the Mongols advanced to the city of Derbent, which refused to surrender. Jebe promised to spare the city in return for the services of 10 guides to take them through the Caucasus. To warn the guides against playing any tricks, the Mongols executed one of them. The crossing of the Caucasus was costly for the Mongols, who had to abandon their siege engines and lost hundreds of men to the cold.

After making it through the Caucasus, the Mongols were met by an alliance consisting of the Lezgians, Alans, and Cherkesses, tribes north of the Caucasus which had mustered an army of around 50,000 men. They were joined by the Cumans, a Turkic people who had an expansive khanate stretching from Lake Balkhash to the Black Sea. The Cumans also convinced the Volga Bulgars and Khazars to join. The Cuman Khan, Koten, placed his army under the command of his brother, Yuri, and his son, Daniel. The first battle between the league and the Mongols was indecisive, but the Mongols managed to persuade the Cumans to abandon the alliance by reminding them of Turkic-Mongol friendship and promising them a share of the booty gained from the Caucasian tribes.

With this arrangement settled, the Mongols attacked the alliance's army and routed it. The Mongols then proceeded to attack the Cumans, who had split into two separate groups as they were returning home, destroying both armies and executing all the prisoners before sacking Astrakhan. The Mongols began pursuing the Cumans as they fled in a north-westerly direction.

The Venetians sent a delegation to the Mongols, and they concluded an alliance in which it was agreed that the Mongols would destroy any other European trading post they came across. As the Mongols pursued the Cumans, Jebe sent a detachment to Crimea, where the Republic of Genoa had trading stations. The Mongols captured and plundered the Genoese city of Soldaia. Meanwhile, Koten fled to the court of his son-in-law, Mstislav Mstislavich of Galicia. He warned Mstislav: "Today the Mongols have taken our land and tomorrow they will take yours". However, the Cumans were ignored for almost a year as the Rus had suffered from Cuman raids for decades. But when news reached Kiev that the Mongols were marching along the Dniester River, the Rus responded. Mstislav gathered an alliance of the Kievan Rus' princes including Mstislav III of Kiev and Prince Yuri II of Vladimir-Suzdal, who promised support. The Rus princes then began mustering their armies and going towards the rendezvous point.

== Battle ==
=== Initial moves ===
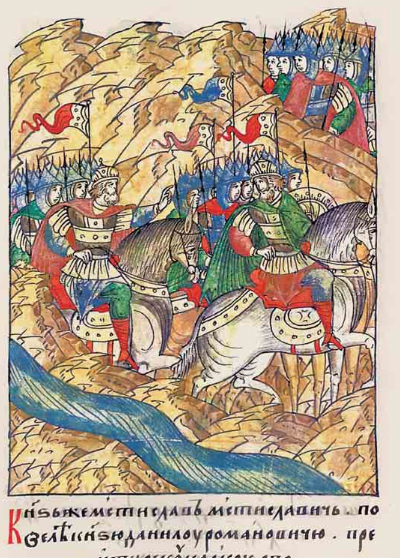
Daniel of Galicia and Mstislav Mstislavich with their troops (illustration from the 16th century)

The number of men present at the battle is disputed. A major factor in this is the fact that no primary sources give the number of men present at the battle, which leaves modern historians to estimate the number of men. Historian Leo de Hartog gives the size of the Rus' army as 30,000, while Richard Gabriel and Hector Hugh Munro claim that the size of the Rus' army was 80,000. De Hartog also estimates the size of the Mongol army as 20,000, while Gabriel estimates that it was around 23,000 men. However, historian John Fennell, an expert on Kievan Rus and early Russian history, and one well-versed in the primary sources, calls many of these figures into doubt, saying the numbers given in the Russian sources (there are no Mongol or Polovtsian sources, at least none that have survived, and other sources from other cultures, if they exist, are rather dubious) are formulaic or exaggerated and the chronicles contradict themselves. The information given in the Novgorod First Chronicle and the Primary Chronicle would imply a total of 11,000 soldiers for the Rus' forces, but Fennel considers even these numbers to be exaggerations. While Russian historians in the Soviet era have traditionally given estimates of around 80,000-100,000, modern Russian historians have taken a revisionist stance with a consensus settling on drastically lower numbers, with the Mongols having a numerical advantage. Russian historian D.G. Khrustalev estimated in 2013 that the Rus' army consisted of 10,000 soldiers (including mercenaries), while the Cumans brought 5,000 cavalry, for a total of 15,000. Carl Sverdrup estimates the army at 8,000, and says 30,000 and 80,000 are enormous exaggerations. The Mongols evidently believed it was a considerable force, given the extreme lengths the Mongols went to to dislocate its formations.

The move by the Rus' army was detected by the Mongols, who were on the east side of the Dnieper River waiting for reinforcements from Jochi, Genghis Khan's eldest son, who was campaigning around the Aral Sea. Jochi, however, had become ill, which meant no reinforcements would be coming.

At the same time, the Rus' attempted to trap the Mongols. The princes of Galicia and Volhynia transported their armies south down the river, while the princes of Kiev and Chernigov advanced north up the river, and the army of Kursk advanced from the front. At the same time, the Cumans attempted to attack the Mongol army's rear. When Jebe learned of this, he sent 10 envoys to the Prince of Kiev. The envoys stated that the Mongols had no feud with the Rus and were only attacking the Cumans; they added that the Mongols were marching east, away from the Rus' cities. Mstislav of Kiev had the envoys executed, and the Mongols responded by sending another set of ambassadors, who declared war.

When Jebe and Subutai heard of the Rus' movements, they began moving east, away from the Rus, which was the only direction in which they could move. However, they left a rearguard of 1,000 under the command of an officer, Hamabek, to report of the Rus movements and act as bait. Soon, Mstislav the Bold reached the river opposite the rearguard, and it became apparent that no prince had been appointed commander-in-chief. Thus, all the princes could act as they pleased. Eventually, Mstislav crossed the river under heavy arrow fire. When the Rus landed, however, their numbers were too great, and the Mongols were killed to the last man.

=== Rus' attack ===
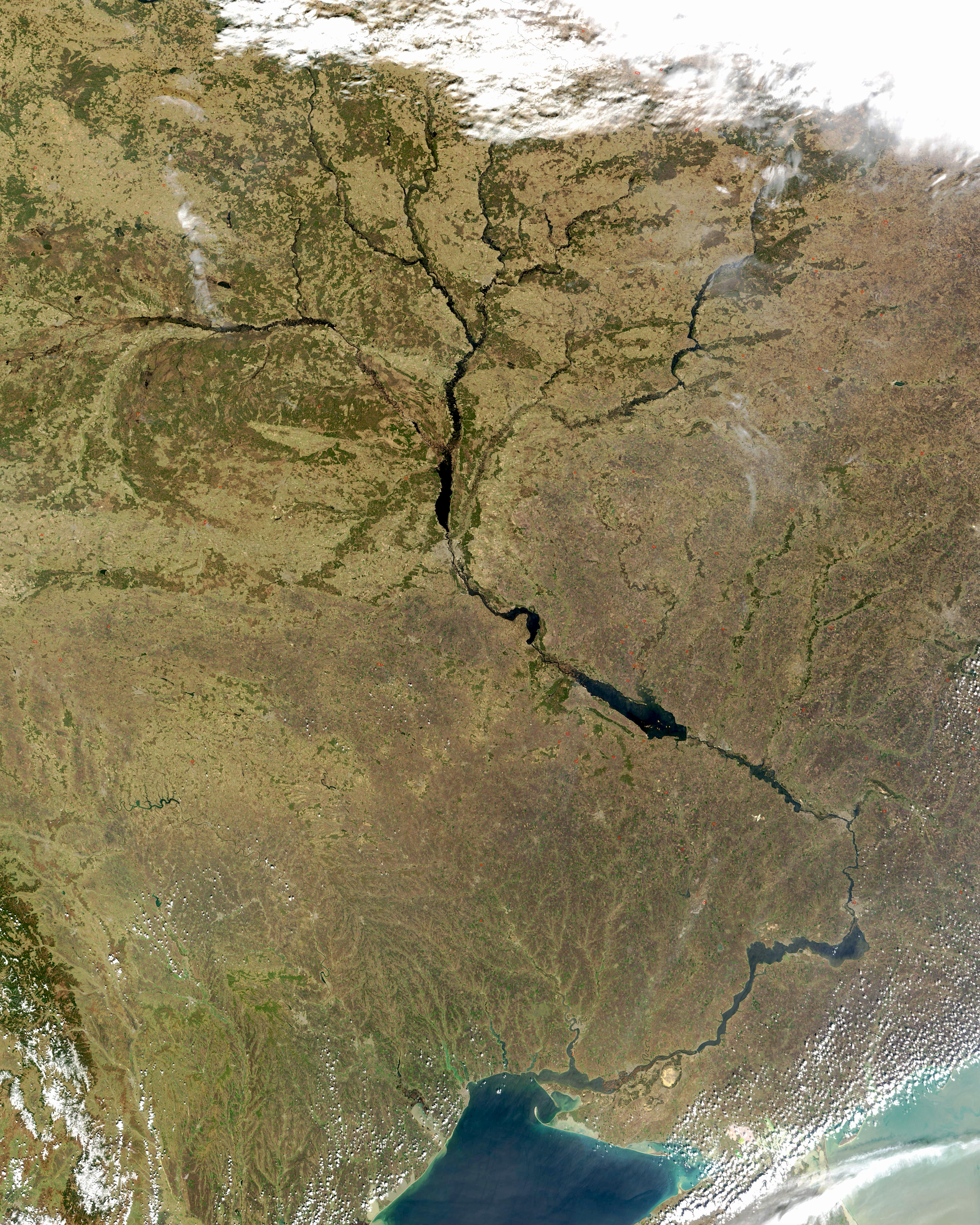
A view of the Dnieper River and the surrounding area

After drawing out the Rus armies for nine days in a feigned retreat, the Mongol army turned to face their pursuers along the Kalka River (the river's location is currently unknown, but it is thought to be the Kalchyk which flows into the Sea of Azov).

The Russian primary sources give only a very general account of the battle itself and the pursuit of the princes back across the steppe. The chronicles name which princes took part and which died, but not much more in terms of the size of armies or casualties. As to the actual battle itself, the chronicles report that the Polovtsy (Cumans) broke and ran without having fought and that their flight through the Rus’ ranks led to mass confusion and resulted in their slaughter by the Mongols.

=== Rus' defeat ===
The Mongols attacked the coalition army when most of it had crossed the Kalka River. The Mongols appear to have caught the coalition forces by surprise in a fast transition from horse archer fire to massed cavalry charges, because the coalition rout began incredibly quickly: the Rus forces bringing up the rear had not yet arrived on the battlefield by the time the front ranks were dissolving. The armies of Volhynia and Kursk made a gap in their line so that the fleeing Cumans could retreat. However, the Mongol heavy cavalry charged through the newly formed gap and also enveloped them. The army of Chernigov, which was not aware that the battle had started, was advancing when they collided head-on with the retreating Cumans. Using smoke bombs to disrupt the coalition's ability to coordinate, the Mongol cavalry took advantage of the confusion in the Chernigov line and attacked, causing the line to collapse. This, in turn, led to the death of Prince Mstislav of Chernigov.

At the same time, the Mongol wings closed around the shattered Rus' army, cutting off its retreat. The surrounded Rus' were hit by volley after volley, accompanied by cavalry charges at any weakness in the formation. As the Mongols were carrying this annihilation out, some of the army – led by Mstislav the Bold – managed to cut their way through the Mongol ring and escape. Mstislav of Kiev arrived to see what remained of the Rus' army fleeing. With his contingent of 10,000 men, he retreated to his stockaded camp, on a hill by the Dnieper. The pursuing Mongol army caught up with Mstislav of Kiev's forces and started to besiege the camp.

== Aftermath ==
The route of the expedition can be seen in the top left corner

The battle was a very costly defeat for the Rus' princes, with Richard Gabriel claiming that they lost 50,000 men, while the Mongol losses were minimal. All the engaged coalition forces were caught with their backs to the river, and thus had no feasible line of retreat. Only Mstislav the Bold was able to save some of his army. Out of the Rus' primary sources, The Primary Chronicle gives a number of 10,000 killed while the much later (and much less reliable) Nikonian Chronicle cites 60,000 killed. The Novgorodian First Chronicle (the most reliable), contemporary to the battle, gives no figures at all, but does say that only 1 in 10 soldiers made it back home, suggesting the number of killed was equivalent to almost the entire army. Out of the Rus' princes, the wounded Daniel of Volhynia and Mstislav the Bold managed to escape the battle. This battle was a significant defeat, given that many of the Rus principalities lost much of their armies, with the notable exception of Vladimir-Suzdal. Historian Robert Marshall describes the raid as follows: "The rest of Subutai's campaign has entered the annals of military history as one of the greatest adventures of cavalry warfare."

The Mongols executed Mstislav of Kiev and the Kievan nobles with the traditional Mongol caveat reserved for royalty and nobility: without shedding blood. Mstislav and his nobles were buried and suffocated under the Mongol general's victory platform at the victory feast. Meanwhile, Mstislav the Bold managed to reach the western side of the Dnieper with what remained of his army. To stop the Mongols from crossing to the western side of the Dnieper, Mstislav destroyed all the boats he could find. After the battle, the people of Rus trembled in fear of this unknown scourge who had emerged from the frontier and destroyed the flower of their army. However, the Mongols were not there to conquer, and merely marched east after plundering.

What the Rus' feared would happen did not come to pass, as the Mongols pursued the prince of Galicia and plundered a few towns in the south before turning around. The Mongol army crossed the Volga River near modern-day Volgograd and passed through Volga Bulgaria. The Mongol army was routed by the Bulgars at the battle of Samara Bend and the remainder of the army continued marching east towards their rendezvous. The Mongols followed this up by attacking the Qanglis Cumans, who had supported their fellow Cumans in the Caucasus a year before. They fought against the Cuman army near the Ural Mountains, defeating and killing the Khan before making them pay tribute.

Following this victory, the Mongols turned east and met Genghis Khan and the rest of the Mongol army in the steppes to the east of the Syr Darya River. Genghis Khan showed great appreciation for his generals' achievements and heaped praise on Jebe and Subutai. Jebe, however, did not survive the campaign long; he died soon afterwards. The importance of the expedition was immense. The expedition was history's longest cavalry raid, with the Mongols riding 5,500 miles (8,900 km) in three years. Subutai also stationed numerous spies in Rus', who provided frequent reports on what was happening in Europe and Rus'.

In 1237, Subutai together with Batu led another attack, and with 120,000 men, conquered the Kievan Rus'.

== Sources ==
=== Printed sources ===
- Boldur, Alexandru (1992). "Istoria Basarabiei" Editura Victor Frunză, București.
- Cross, Samuel Hazzard, and Olgerd P. Sherbowitz-Wetzor, trans. (1953). Russian Primary Chronicle. Lavrentian Text Cambridge, MA: Medieval Academy of America.
- Fennell, John (1983). The Crisis of Medieval Russia 1200–1304. London and New York: Longman. ISBN 0-582-48150-3
- Gabriel, Richard (2004). Subotai The Valiant: Genghis Khan's Greatest General. Praeger. ISBN 0-275-97582-7.
- de Hartog, Leo (1989). Genghis Khan: Conqueror of the World. I. B. Tauris. ISBN 1-85043-139-6
- Jackson, Peter (2005). The Mongols and the West, 1221–1410. Pearson Education Limited. ISBN 0-582-36896-0
- Marshall, Robert (1993). Storm from the East: From Genghis Khan to Khubilai Khan. University of California Press. ISBN 0-520-08300-8
- Martin, Janet (1995). Medieval Russia: 980–1584. Cambridge University Press. ISBN 0-521-36276-8
- Michell, Robert, and Neville Forbes, eds. and trans. (1914). The Chronicle of Novgorod. London: Camden Society.
- Munro, Hector Hugh (1900). The Rise of the Russian Empire. G. Richards.
- Wallace, Robert (1967). Rise of Russia. Time-Life Books. ISBN 0-900658-37-1/

=== Online sources ===
- The Chronicle of Novgorod online: http://faculty.washington.edu/dwaugh/rus/texts/MF1914.pdf
- Rossabi, Morris (October 2004). "All the Khan's horses" (PDF). Columbia University.
- Astaykin, A. A.; Pyatnov, A. P. (6 July 2023). "Калкская битва 1223". Great Russian Encyclopedia.
