= Battle of Samara Bend =

1223 battle between Volga Bulgaria and Mongol Empire

- Part of Mongol invasion of Volga Bulgaria
Date	Autumn of 1223
Location	Kernek, Volga Bulgaria
Result	Bulgar tactical victory

Belligerents
Volga Bulgaria	Mongol Empire

Commanders and leaders
Ghabdulla Chelbir	Unknown, likely Subutai, Jebe, and Jochi

Strength
Unknown	Unknown

The Battle of Samara Bend (Russian: Монгольско-булгарское сражение, lit. 'Mongolian-Bulgar battle'), also known as the Battle of Kernek, was the first battle between the Volga Bulgaria and the Mongol Empire, which took place during the autumn of 1223 at the southern border of Volga Bulgaria, one of the first skirmishes or battles the Mongols lost.

The battle at Samara Bend began with the Bulgar forces retreating and the Mongols pursuing them, leading them successfully into a Bulgar ambush. The Bulgars counterattacked the Mongols, and drove them back.

== Background ==
Timeline for the Expedition of Subutai and Jebe (the Mongol reconnaissance of the western steppes)

• 12 January 1221 Muhammad II of Khwarazm dies on the run from the Mongols on the island of Abeskum during Genghiz Khan's destruction of the Khwarezmid Empire campaign

• Genghiz Khan summons his general Subutai to Samarkand upon hearing the news of the Shah's death; Subutai gives a report on how best to defeat the new Shah, Jalal ad-Din (Muhammed's son); Subutai requests not to be part of the final campaign and proposes to reconnoiter the west bank of the Caspian Sea and the steppes beyond - Genghis accepts this plan and assigns two tumens (20,000 men) to Subutai and his other best general, Jebe, under the condition that the campaign not take more than two years and that on their return march they find and join with the Khan's son Jochi in the east to engage the Volga Bulgars

• Subutai rejoins Jebe at their camp near the Caspian (delta of the Kura river) - the “reconnaissance in force” begins at the end of February 1221

• the Mongols invade Georgia and annihilate George IV of Georgia's much larger forces on the plain of Khuman

• the Mongols sack Margha and Hamadan

• the Mongols move into Georgia again towards Derbend and are attacked by King George IV with another army - the Mongols destroy it and George IV escapes with only his rearguard

• the Mongols cross the Caucasus with great hardship in winter to the Fergana valley and are to find a 50,000 man army waiting for them of Cumans assembled by their khagan Kotian and his Bulgar, Khazar and Avar allies under the command of Kotian's brother Yuri and son Daniel

• the Mongols engage the Cumans but can make no headway due to their unfavorable position and they withdraw - the Mongols resort to bribing the Cumans with half of their spoils taken from Georgia if they will join them - the Cumans agree but after taking payment they break camp under darkness and leave their allies

• the Mongols attack and destroy the remaining Cuman allied forces and impress those survivors considered useful into their army

• the Mongols with great speed overtake the Cumans who had fled towards Astrakhan on the Volga and extirpate them - both Yuri and Daniel are killed and the Cumans massacred to a man - the Mongols recover their treasure used in the ‘bribe’ - on news of this defeat many Cumans flee west to the borders of Hungary and the Byzantine Empire's trading station on the Sea of Azov

• the Mongols sack Astrakhan

• Subutai and Jebe split their force - Jebe marches west to the river Don to await Subutai who marches south to the Sea of Azov to ensure the Cumans cannot threaten their expedition from the rear - Subutai's force destroys the towns along the shore and what Cumans they find and meet Venetian merchants from Europe for the first time - he makes a pact with them to destroy Genoese trading posts in exchange for information on the West and military intelligence on the kingdoms there

• Jebe makes an alliance with the chief of the Brodniki, Polskinia, and 5,000 Brodniki troops join his forces on the Don

• Subutai destroys the Genoese trading station of Soldaia (Sudak) on the Crimea, then rejoins Jebe - their army now has perhaps 25,000 men - they march unopposed to the Dniester river

• Autumn and Winter 1222 - the Mongol army marches up and down the Dniester using terror tactics to maintain security from attack - scouting parties are sent as far west as possible to gather military intelligence on southern Russia and the states along the borders of the Carpathian mountains

• their objective completed, the Mongols begin the march home to Mongolian territory

• Kotian had fled north with the remnants of such Cumans as he could and was pleading for an alliance with the Russian princes against the Mongols - at a conference the Russian princes of Galicia (Mstislave the Daring), his son-in-law Daniel of Volynia, Prince Oleg of Kursk, and the Princes of Kiev and Chernigov agree to join Kotian to stop the Mongols - Duke Yuri of Suzdal promises to send an army under the command of his nephew the Prince of Rostov - the nominal strength of this allied force was 80,000 men

• the Mongols are aware via their spies and scouts that a military action is being planned against them - the allied Russian and Cuman forces are approaching from several directions

• the Mongols cross the Dnieper where the expected rendezvous with Jochi does not take place - Jochi is supposedly ill in the east and is delayed

• the Mongols send ambassadors to the Princes of Chernigov and Kiev to attempt peace - the Russians kill the ambassadors - a second Mongol embassy arrives to declare war

• the Mongols were still under the Khan's orders to suppress the Volga Bulgars, but this cannot be safely done with enemies in their rear - the elimination of the Russian threat was a military necessity

• Subutai and Jebe leave 1,000 men under the command of Hamabek on the east bank of the Dnieper to delay the Russian crossing for as long as possible - this rearguard was able to inflict heavy casualties but was eventually overwhelmed and destroyed and Hamabek was captured and executed

• May 1223 - the Mongols are slowly retreating over land they had excellent knowledge of north of the Sea of Azov - their mobility allowed them to easily outpace the Russian forces but they had decided on a confrontation with them - on 31 May 1223 they stopped along the western side of the river Kalka (Kalmyus)

• Battle of the Kalka River - the Mongol forces, numbering at this point perhaps 23,000 - exterminate the combined Cuman-Russian armies - some 40,000 Russian and Cuman soldiers are killed - the Mongol tactics and weaponry, with which the Russians had no prior experience, are superior to the rather unorganized assault by the allied armies - the Mongols pursue the remnants of the allied forces to the Dneiper

• the Prince of Kiev had retreated with his army mostly intact 150 miles back to the Dnieper, not having been part of the reckless charges at Kalka; however they were overtaken by the Mongols and eventually massacred in their fortified camp

• the Prince of Rostov stopped and returned with his army to Suzdal upon the news of the defeat at Kalka to prepare for an attack, but it never came - the Mongols had resumed their march east

This Mongol campaign had killed perhaps as many as 200,000 soldiers of various nations and never lost a major battle. At this point in history, the Mongol army was the finest army in the world - it was professional, extremely well trained and equipped, a Mongol rose through the ranks based on his merit rather than his position in Mongol society, and generals such as Jebe and Subutai along with the Great Khan had developed revolutionary tactics all controlled with iron discipline. Its mobility was unmatched by any other military force. The utilization of the Mongolian horse (steppe pony) allowed for survival of their steeds in areas where other horses would starve or die from conditions. The Mongol commanders also realized the quality of their army and were not impressed by the mere size of the opposing forces of their enemies. In this way they could stand and hold, and their various tactics would often cause an enemy to break and retreat in a panic that inevitably lead to a rout from Mongol mounted archers and lancers. They often employed siege engines and engineers from China and Persia in their ranks to enable them to take fortified cities - however, this would not have been practical on the fast-campaign of Jebe/Subutai. This was the army now marching to face the Bulgars on the Volga.

The Volga Bolgars/Bulgars had built up a powerful state in the second half of the 7th century between the Sea of Azov and the Kuban valley. They were apparently of Turkic origin and related to the Kutrigur Huns. Some of them migrated to Europe, forming an empire there in the Balkans. The rest slowly moved northward in the direction of Kama and Kazan to found Great Bulgaria. The Volga Bulgars on the Volga-Kama region embraced Islam in 922, becoming an important trade center between the Islamic world and Europe. The Volga Bulgars formed a settled civilisation with towns and Islamic culture till the Mongol invasion. Although there were peaceful relations with Kievan Rus in the 10th and 11th centuries, the principality of Vladimir-Suzdal was expanding its domain on the middle Volga during the 12th century, and their attempts to monopolize the Volga trade resulted in hostilities with the Volga Bulgars. Various Bulgar towns and villages were conquered by the Russians - Brjahimov (old Bulgar), which forced the Bulgars to establish a new capital at Bilar (Biljarsk, Biler), and eventually the most important Bulgar town on the eastern side of the Volga, Osel, was captured. The Bulgar state had been weakened by these conquests.

== Battle ==
During the mopping-up operations of the Mongols on the Dnieper, a messenger arrived from the Great Khan ordering Subutai and Jebe to return to the Volga river, locate Jochi and return with him to Mongolia. According to historian John Chambers, "The delayed arrival of the reinforcements which were at last advancing towards the Volga and the absence of Jochi from a preliminary briefing with his father had not been due to illness. Jochi was an imaginative and determined commander, as his campaigns in Khwarizm had shown, but his headstrong independence had made him unreliable . . . He (the Khan) had hoped that under the influence of his two most distinguished generals Jochi might return to (the Khan's) camp where they could flaunt a family loyalty that would crush any hope of intrigue (by Jochi's detractors.)" Jochi brought a single tumen (10,000 men) to reinforce the army of Jebe/Subutai, meeting on the west bank of the Volga. The old directive was no longer in force per the orders from the messenger, but the return journey home gave them the opportunity to reconnoiter the north-western boundaries of the Mongol Empire. They reduced the Bulgars on the west bank of the Volga before an attack was made further north.

The entire historical record of the "Battle of Samara Bend" consists of a short account by the Muslim historian Ibn al-Athir, writing in Mosul some 1100 miles away from the event. According to the expert-opinion of historian Peter Jackson (historian), the most accurate translation of the passage is contained in D.S. Richards' book, The Chronicle of Ibn al-Athir for the Crusading Period from al-Kāmil fī’l-ta'rīkh. Part 3: The Years 589–629/1193–1231, The Ayyūbids after Saladin and the Mongol Menace., vol.3, quoted below:

Account of the Tatars' return from the lands of the Rus and the Qipjaq to their ruler

After the Tatars had treated the Rus as we have described and plundered their country, they withdrew and went to the Bulghars in the year 620 [1223-1224]. When the Bulghars heard of their approach, they laid ambushes for them in several places. They then marched out to engage them and drew them on until they had passed the ambush site. They emerged behind their backs, so that they were caught in the middle. They fell to the sword on every side. Most of them were killed and only a few escaped.

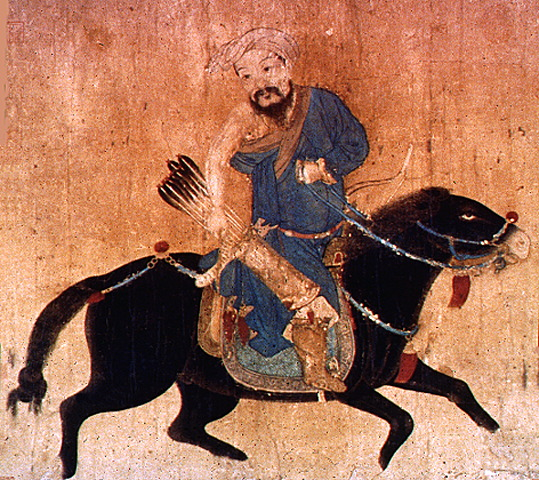
Mongol light cavalryman. Chinese miniature, Ming dynasty. Ink and colour on paper. Victoria and Albert Museum, London

There is another version, however. They numbered about four thousand and they set out for Saqsin on the way back to their ruler, Chingiz Khan. The lands of the Qipjaq became free of them and the survivors returned home.

Some less-recent sources speculate about the losses in this battle, but in Peter Jackson's expert-opinion, the second passage relates to the size of Jebe/Subutai's army, not the number of Mongol "survivors" from the ambush - however, there is no mention in the alternative tale of any encounter with the Bulgars.

In this history, no mention is made of who commanded the military probe that was ambushed, or how large it was. Historian A.H. Halikov identifies the Bulgarian army commander as Ilgam Khan. Based on the record of Jebe and Subutai's entire careers, masters of ambush themselves, a military conundrum exists in that a weakened Bulgar state would be able to defeat them. However, if Jochi was in command, it may be significant that upon the return of the Mongol force to Mongol territory, Jochi entered his father's tent, interrupting an audience, knelt before the throne, and placed Genghis Khans hand upon his forehead, the Mongol stance for utter submission.[11]

Various historical secondary sources - Morgan, Chambers, Grousset - state that the Mongols actually defeated the Bulgars, Chambers even going so far as to say that the Bulgars had made up stories to tell the (recently crushed) Russians that they had beaten the Mongols and driven them from their territory.

Whatever the case, after this battle the Mongols skirted the Urals defeating the Saxin tribes (east Saxons) there and then moved south to defeat the eastern Cumans-Kipchaks-Kanglis, where their army was destroyed and their khagan killed; subsequently they were forced to pay a large tribute to the Mongols. This would hardly have been possible if the Mongol force had been severely damaged at the "Battle of Samara Bend."

== Numbers ==
The details about the Bulgar ambush have not survived.

== Aftermath ==
The reverse (if one indeed occurred) at the "Battle of Samara Bend" did not stop the Mongol expedition from reducing the Saxin tribes and defeating the Kanglis afterwards. Laden with tribute, the Mongols then returned home. However, Jebe Noyan - one of the Khan's greatest generals and friends - died of a fever on the Imil River in Tarbagatai on the journey.

In 1236, the Mongols under Batu and Subotai returned to Volga Bulgaria and made it part of the Mongol Empire.

== Bibliography ==
- (in Russian) История Татарстана, Казань, "ТаРИХ", 2001. (History of Tatarstan)
- (in Russian) История Татарской АССР, Казань, Татарское книжное издательство, 1980 (History of the Tatar ASSR)
- Richard A. Gabriel, Genghis Khan's Greatest General:Subotai the Valiant, University of Oklahoma Press, 2006
- I. Zimonyi,"The First Mongol Raid against the Volga-Bulgars," Altaic Studies. Papers at the 25th Meeting of the PIAC at Uppsala, 1982, eds. G. Jarring and S. Rosén (Stockholm, 1985)
- D.S. Richards, The Chronicle of Ibn al-Athir for the Crusading Period from al-Kāmil fī'l-ta'rīkh. Part 3: The Years 589–629/1193–1231, The Ayyūbids after Saladin and the Mongol Menace., vol.3 (Ashgate, 2008)
