= Kalchyk (river) =

River in Donetsk Oblast, Ukraine

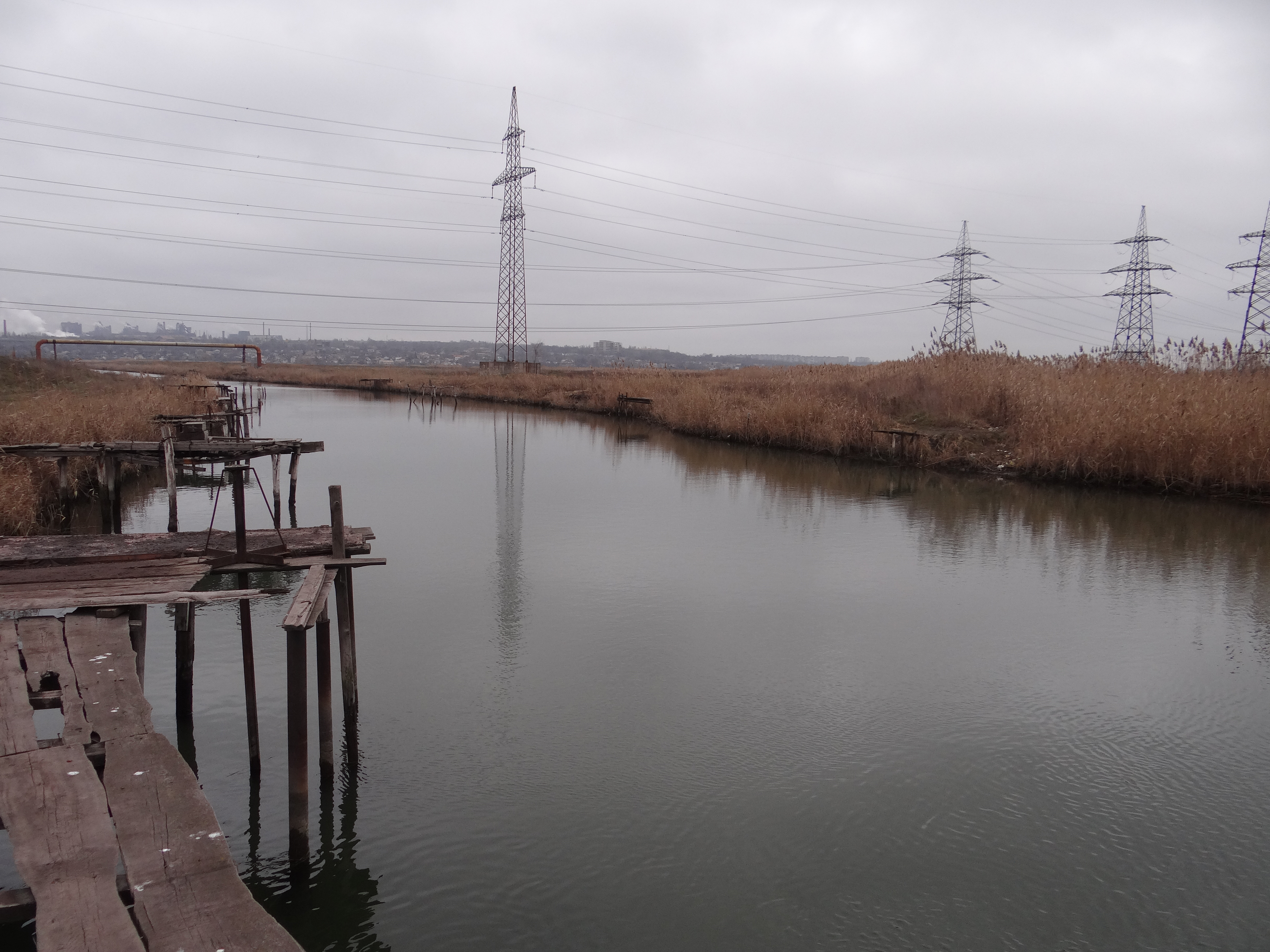

Location
- Country: Ukraine

Physical characteristics
- Source
  - location: Ukraine
- Mouth: Sea of Azov
  - coordinates: 47.1179°N 37.6105°E
- Length: 90 km
- Basin size: 1260 sq. km

Basin features
- Progression: Kalmius→ Sea of Azov

The Kalchyk (Ukrainian: Кальчик) is a river in the Donetsk and Zaporizhzhia Oblasts of Ukraine. It is historically known as the Kalka. It flows into the Kalmius, which it enters near the city of Mariupol.

Supposedly, the river was the scene of the Battle of the Kalka River between the Mongol Empire and Kievan Rus' in 1223. It was also the scene of the decisive Battle of the Kalka River (1381) between Mamai and Tokhtamysh which ended the Great Troubles (1359–1381), a war of succession within the Golden Horde.

== Bibliography ==
- Halperin, Charles J. (1987). Russia and the Golden Horde: The Mongol Impact on Medieval Russian History. Indiana University. p. 222. ISBN 9781850430575. (e-book).
