= Subutai =

Mongol general under Genghis Khan and Ögedei Khan

- ᠰᠦᠪᠡᠭᠡᠳᠡᠢ
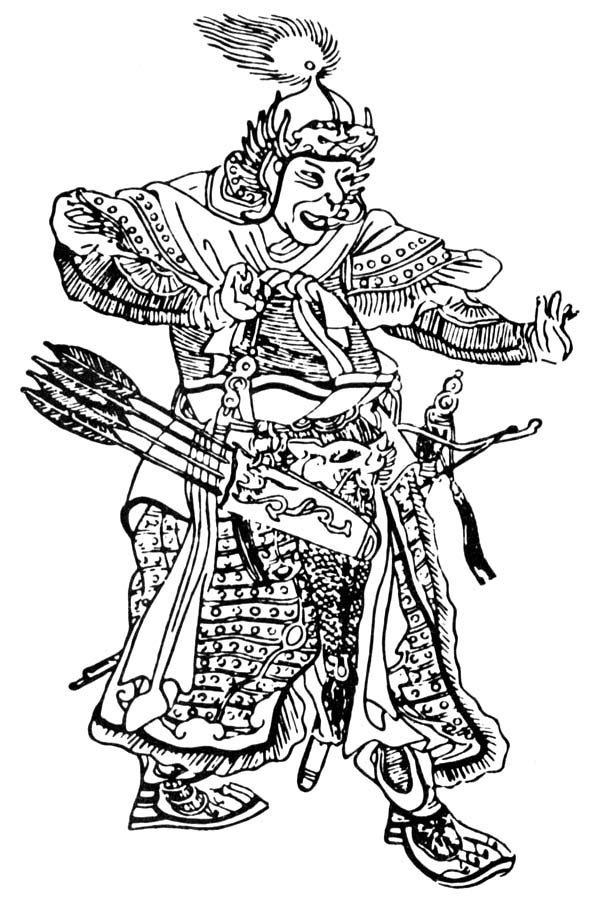
- Born: c. 1175; Burkhan Khaldun, Khamag Mongol
- Died: 1248 (aged 72–73); Tuul River, Mongol Empire
- Occupation: General
- Title: Örlög baatar, noyan of a Mingghan
- Spouses: Tangzi Khatun; Zainshi Khatun; Tenzii Khatun; Yangdai Khatun
- Children: Tsenzai; Tengziin of China; Tangzei Khan; Wengzi; Ulanqatai; Uriyangkhadai
- Relatives: Aju (grandson); Jelme (brother); Chaurkhan; Qaban, Nerbi
- Military career
- Allegiance: Mongol Empire
- Conflicts: Irghiz River skirmish Battle of Yehuling; Battle of Khunan; Battle of the Kalka River; Battle of Daohuigu; Battle of Sanfengshan; Battle of Legnica; Battle of Mohi; Siege of Kaifeng (1232)

Subutai (Note: Chinese: 速不台; pinyin: Sùbùtái; IPA: [sûpûtʰǎɪ]; Classical Mongolian: ᠰᠦᠪᠡᠭᠡᠳᠡᠢ Söbegedei; Modern Mongolian: Сүбээдэй, romanized: Sübeedei, pronounced [supéte]) (c. 1175–1248) was a Mongol general and the primary military strategist of Genghis Khan and Ögedei Khan. He ultimately directed more than 20 campaigns, during which he conquered more territory than any other commander in history as part of the expansion of the Mongol Empire, the largest contiguous empire in human history. He often gained victory by means of sophisticated strategies and routinely coordinated movements of armies that operated hundreds of kilometers apart from each other. Subutai is regarded as one of the greatest military commanders in history, and the single greatest in Mongolian history. He was instrumental in the conquests of Genghis Khan and Ögedei Khan.

== Early life ==
Historians believe Subutai was born in the year 1175, probably just west of the upper Onon River in what is now Mongolia. Some historical accounts claim that he belonged to the Uriankhai clan. As a member of the reindeer people, according to these accounts, Subutai lacked the natural horsemanship training from birth that all Mongols possessed, making him an outsider among them.

However, recent scholarship has discounted this earlier narrative. Stephen Pow and Jingjing Liao note that "...the sense of irony conjured by imagining that the Mongol Empire’s greatest general was a reindeer-herding outsider to steppe nomadic culture has a strong literary appeal to modern authors."

In fact, Subutai's family had been associated with the family of Temujin (future Genghis Khan) for many generations. Subutai's great-great-grandfather, Nerbi, was supposedly an ally of the Mongol Khan Tumbina Sechen. Subutai's father, Jarchigudai, supposedly supplied food to Temujin and his followers when they were in dire straits at lake Baljuna, and Subutai's elder brother Jelme also served as a general in the Mongol army and was a close companion of Temujin. Jelme rescued a severely wounded Temujin (hit by an arrow from Jebe, then an enemy) in the process of unification of the Mongolian plateau. Another brother, Chaurkhan (also romanized as Ca'urqan) is mentioned in the Secret History of the Mongols.

According to Subutai's biography in the History of Yuan, Subutai's father was once driving a herd of sheep in order to present them to his overlord, Taizu (Genghis Khan). Encountering robbers, he was seized. Huluhun (Subutai's brother) and Subutai arrived in good time, and with their lances stabbed some of the robbers. Horses and men fell together, and the remainder of the band withdrew and departed. Consequently, they relieved their father's difficulty, and the sheep were able to attain the emperor's station.

Despite this close family association, some consider Subutai's career proof that the Mongol Empire was a meritocracy. He was a commoner by birth, the son of Jarchigudai, who was supposedly a blacksmith. When he was 14 years old, Subutai left his clan to join Temujin's army, following in the footsteps of his older brother Jelme who had joined when he was 17 years old, and he rose to the very highest command available to one who was not a blood relative to Genghis. Within a decade he rose to become a general, in command of one of 4 tumens operating in the vanguard. During the invasion of Northern China in 1211, Subutai was partnered with the senior Mongol general Jebe, an apprentice and partnership they would maintain until Jebe's death in 1223. In 1212, he took Huan by storm, the first major independent exploit mentioned in the sources. Genghis Khan is reported to have called him one of his "dogs of war," who were 4 of his 8 top lieutenants, in The Secret History of the Mongols:

They are the Four Dogs of Temujin. They have foreheads of brass, their jaws are like scissors, their tongues like piercing awls, their heads are iron, their whipping tails swords . . . In the day of battle, they devour enemy flesh. Behold, they are now unleashed, and they slobber at the mouth with glee. These four dogs are Jebe, and Qubilai Barlas (different than Kublai Khan), Jelme, and Subotai.

— The Secret History of the Mongols

Appointed to the prestigious post of Genghis Khan's ger (yurt) door guard during his teen years, Mongol histories say that Subutai said to Genghis Khan, "I will ward off your enemies as felt cloth protects one from the wind." This access enabled him to listen on, and later join, the Mongol strategy meetings somewhere around his late teens and early twenties. Throughout most of Genghis Khan's lifetime, Subutai would have the opportunity to apprentice on detached missions under the elite Jebe (1211–12, 1213–14, 1219–23) and Muqali (1213–14), in addition to Genghis Khan himself (1219).

Subutai's first chance at independent command came in 1197 during action against the Merkit, when he was 22 years old. Subutai's role was to act as the vanguard and defeat one of the Merkit camps at the Tchen River. Subutai refused Genghis Khan's offer for extra elite troops, and instead traveled to the Merkit camp alone, posing as a Mongol deserter. Subutai managed to convince the Merkits that the main Mongol army was far away, and they were in no danger. As a result, the Merkit lowered their guard and limited their patrols, allowing the Mongols to easily surprise and encircle the Merkits, capturing two generals. He also served as a commander of the vanguard with distinction in the 1204 battle against the Naiman that gave the Mongols total control over Mongolia.

== As a general ==
Subutai was a major innovator in the art of war. In the invasions of China, Russia, and Europe, Subutai routinely coordinated large forces often separated by large distances. Subutai's maneuvers were designed to mislead his foes and strike them from unexpected directions. The Mongol invasion of the Jin in 1232 continually pulled the hitherto successful Jin forces apart despite their highly advantageous terrain, as they could not determine which Mongol armies were the feints and which were the true threats until their main army became isolated and starved. Strongly fortified locations would be bypassed and ignored until all organized resistance had been destroyed. Sieges would be limited to critical or vulnerable locations; in other situations, the Mongols either left a blockading force, or simply ignored fortified citadels and destroyed the surrounding agriculture so that the remaining people would starve if they remained within fortified walls.

In contrast to the common perception of steppe horse archer armies slowly weakening their foes with arrows for many hours or even days, such as at the battle of Carrhae or the battle of Manzikert, Subutai fought in a much more decisive and fluid manner where heavy firepower was used to create openings for rapid cavalry charges with deep formations. At the battle of the Kalka River in 1223, Subutai's 20,000 man army routed the 80,000 man Russian army by stringing it out after a 9-day retreat, and then immediately turning and delivering a decisive charge without a prolonged missile bombardment. The vanguard of the Russian army was already put in flight before the second wave even reached the battlefield and began to deploy.

Subutai was one of the first Mongol generals, alongside Genghis Khan, who realized the value of engineers in siege warfare. Even in field battles he made use of siege engines. In the Battle of Mohi, the Hungarian crossbowmen repelled a night bridge crossing by the Mongols, and inflicted considerable casualties on the Mongols fighting to cross the river the following day. Subutai ordered huge stonethrowers to clear the bank of Hungarian crossbowmen and open the way for his light cavalry to cross the river without further losses. This use of siege weapons was one of the first recorded uses of artillery bombardments against the enemy army to disrupt their resistance while simultaneously attacking them. In execution, his usage functioned more akin to the creeping barrage of World War I, used to soften and disrupt enemy lines right before an attack.

Like Genghis Khan, Subutai was a master at creating divisions within the enemy ranks and surprising them. The terrifying Mongol reputation, combined with highly effective spy networks that spread discord, as well as incentives to key local leaders, prevented his opponents from effectively uniting and fighting at their full capacity.

== Central Asian campaigns (1217–1220) ==
In 1217, Genghis Khan sent Subutai to hunt down the hated Merkits and their allies, the Cuman-Kipchak confederation, in modern-day central Kazakhstan. Subutai defeated them on the Chu River in 1217 and again in 1219 in Wild Kipchak territory. Before the battle of the Chem River in 1219, Subutai had his vanguard carry children's toys and leave them behind, as if they were a group of families fleeing from the Merkit. As a result of this deception, Subutai's army was able to surprise, encircle, and capture all of the Merkit/Kipchak leadership.

Mohammed II of Khwarizm attacked Subutai shortly afterwards along the Irghiz River. Despite being outnumbered three to one against the Sultan's elite forces which had conquered much of Central Asia, Subutai held him off after a fierce battle and retreated during the night. According to Persian sources, this battle seems to have eroded Mohammed's confidence in his ability to defeat the Mongols in pitched battle, since Subutai only commanded a small 20,000 man force and did not want to even fight him. Supposedly the Mongol army had destroyed his left wing, and nearly broken his center and captured him, until reinforcements from his son arrived and the battlefield turned dark. Because of this battle, Mohammed was unable to take advantage of the upheaval in the Kara-Khitai Empire (simultaneously being conquered by the Mongolian general Jebe), like he had in earlier wars.

Genghis Khan led the Mongol army westwards in late 1219 to invade Khwarizm as retaliation for the execution of Mongol ambassadors. With roughly 100,000 armed men, the Mongol army was numerically superior to the forces of the Khwarizim Empire, and through deception and rapid maneuver, the Mongols defeated the isolated Khwarezm armies in detail before they could react. Serving as the Mongol equivalent of Genghis Khan's Chief of Staff, Subutai marched with the Khan's army through the deadly Kyzylkum Desert to emerge behind the Khwarezm defense network at Bukhara. After the rapid capture of the Khwarezm center of defense, Samarkand, Genghis Khan dispatched Subutai and Jebe with 30,000 men to hunt the Khwarezm Shah and prevent him from rallying the other Khwarezm armies. Shah Mohammed attempted to save himself by fleeing into central Persia, but while he eluded capture, the relentless chase meant he could not rally his forces. As a result, the several hundred thousand man Khwarezm forces in reserve remained divided and were easily destroyed piecemeal by Genghis Khan's main army. Drained by the fierce pursuit, Mohammed fell ill and died at a fishing village on an island in the Caspian Sea in early 1221, an ignominious end for the man who styled himself the 'Second Alexander'.

== The Great Raid (1220–1223) ==
Routes taken by Mongol invaders

Subutai and Jebe spent part of the 1219 winter in Azerbaijan and Iran, raiding and looting while preventing the western Khwarezm forces from assisting the rest of the empire to the east. Here he conceived the idea of conducting the most audacious reconnaissance-in-force in history, which was described by Edward Gibbon as [an expedition] "which has never been attempted, and has never been repeated": 20,000 Mongol forces would circle the Caspian Sea through the Caucasus Mountains to fall on the rear of the Wild Kipchaks and Cumans.

After destroying resistance in Persia and submitting Azerbaijan, the Mongols invaded the Christian Kingdom of Georgia. Though the king George IV of Georgia was reluctant to commit to battle, Subutai and Jebe forced his hand by ravaging the countryside and killing his people. Subutai and Jebe then defeated the Georgian army despite the presence of many thousands of Georgian knights, by luring the knights away from their infantry with a feigned retreat, then enveloping the knights. After destroying them, the Mongols encircled and crushed the Georgian army. Subutai, who was identified by the Georgians as being in command, originally lured the Georgians into thinking his army was a friendly ally by having his men parade in front of crosses, and using spies to start false rumors that the Mongols were actually Christian wonder-workers who had come to assist the Georgians.

This Mongol reconnaissance mission may have inadvertently altered the history of the Crusades, as Georgia had planned on sending their now destroyed army to join the Fifth Crusade. Instead, King George's sister Rusudan had to write to the Pope Honorius III to explain that they could not assist the Crusade because their whole army had been disintegrated. Though Georgia lay defenseless after these catastrophic defeats, the Mongol mission was to raid and scout, not conquer.

After ravaging Georgia, the Mongols cut across the Caucasus Mountains during the winter to get around the Derbent Pass. The Mongols were tricked by their guides into taking a perilous route and emerged from the mountains exhausted, only to be confronted with a far larger steppe coalition army. Using clever diplomacy, Subutai isolated and defeated the Alans, Circassians, and Don Kipchaks/Cumans in detail. After plundering the southern Russian steppes, the Russian princes united with the retreating Cuman confederacy to defeat the Mongols. Subutai sacrificed the 1,000 men of his rear guard to induce the coalition army to recklessly pursue him and become separated. The plan worked, but strategic advantage came at a high price. In all likelihood the 1,000 men were led by Jebe who was killed by some Kipchaks. As expected the coalition army pursued the Mongols and after retreating for 9 days, Subutai suddenly turned and crushed the combined Rus' and Cuman army at the Kalka (31 May 1223). Arab historian Ibn al-Athir mentions a campaign against Volga Bulgaria, where the Mongol army was defeated in late 1223 or early 1224 (620). According to Ibn al-Athir, 4,000 men survived from the Mongol side in this battle. The remaining army proceeded to Desht-i Qipchaq, where they joined the army of Jochi, but historians have doubted this account in light of the Mongols seeking out and defeating the Qangli Turks in southern Russia shortly afterward.

== Invasions of the Xi Xia and Jin China (1207, 1209, 1211–1215, 1226–1227) ==
In the initial invasion of the Jin in 1211, Subutai served with Jebe's army that attacked the Chinese forts around the eastern edge of the Great Wall (not the Ming Great Wall). In late 1211 he was the first to scale the walls of the key fortress of Huan-Chou, and took part in the ambush of a major Jin army at Wu Sha Pao and the climactic battle of Yehuling. In 1212, he may have served with Jebe during the latter's daring capture of Liaoyang, and in 1213 he served with Muqali and Jebe in a great raid in Shandong.

Subutai played a key part in the campaign against the Tanguts of Xi Xia in 1226, serving as commander of the flank army to strike the Tanguts in the rear. While Genghis invaded the Xi Xia by a more traditional northern route, Subutai unexpectedly attacked from the west over the mountains and inhospitable deserts in modern Turkestan, causing Tangut resistance to collapse. The Tangut Empire was cut in two: with Genghis preventing reinforcements being sent west, Subutai subdued resistance in the west and joined with Genghis's main army to conquer the east. In 1227, he conquered the Jin districts along the upper Wei River, and even raided the Kingdom of Tibet. Though the Mongols conquered Xi Xia, Mongol operations against Jin China were interrupted by the death of Genghis Khan in 1227. Genghis Khan was succeeded by his son Ögedei in 1229.

=== Conquest of Jin China (1231–1235) ===
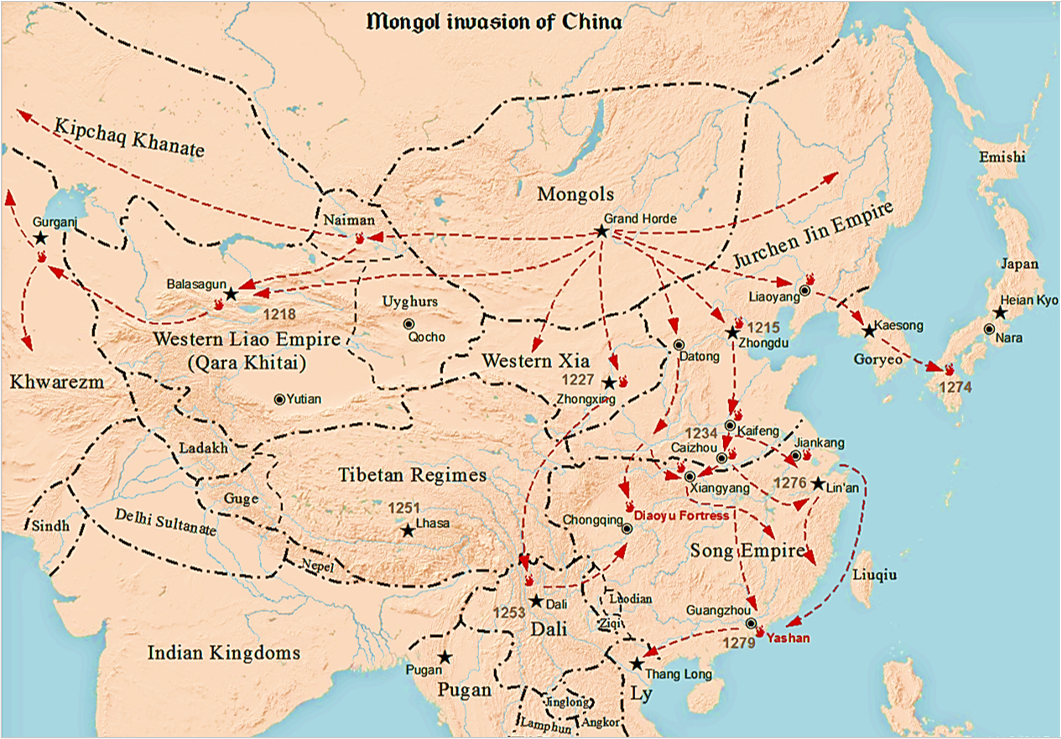
Mongol conquest of Jurchen Jin and other regimes of China

After a humiliating defeat by the resurgent Jin in 1230–1231, Ögedei personally led the main Mongol army against the Jin (in Central China) and appointed Subutai to salvage the situation. Subutai had originally been assigned to conquer the Kipchak Turks in central Russia in 1229, but was hurriedly recalled to China in 1229–1230 after the Mongol general Doqolqu suffered a major defeat. Against Subutai, the Jin generals retreated from Shaanxi and implemented a scorched earth policy to hold the fortified Tongguan Pass and block any access to the Jin stronghold of Henan. They calculated that the scorched earth policies would deny the Mongols the ability to sustain a lengthy siege, and their lines of fortifications and difficult terrain would prevent the Mongols from outmaneuvering them.

At the Battle of Daohuigu, Subutai initially attempted to outflank the Jin by feinting an attack at the fortified location of Weizhou and maneuvering through an unguarded side corridor. Though the Jin were fooled by the feint, they moved with great alacrity once Subutai's main advance was discovered, and the attempt to break into the plains of Henan ended in failure after Subutai's advanced raiding parties were checked at Shan-ch’e-hui. The Mongols defeated a relieving force and captured Fengxiang, a secondary target, by concentrating 400 trebuchets at a corner of the wall. However, the overall campaign seemed to have reached a stalemate.

In 1231–1232, Subutai made another attempt to outmaneuver the Jin fortified lines by using a similar highly audacious approach that they had employed in Khwarezm (1219) and Xi Xia (1226). The Mongols divided into three armies, one to attack Henan from the North in the center of the Yellow River, another to attempt to cross the Yellow River in Shandong in the east, and the last, under Subutai and Tolui, invading the Song Empire and attacking Henan from the more exposed south. The Song initially refused to allow the Mongols passage through the rugged Qinling mountains, so Subutai dodged their forces and isolated the mountain citadels one by one. Disheartened by the ease of the Mongol advance against their strong fortifications, the Song agreed to supply guides. This time Subutai was able to outmaneuver the Jin armies and cross the Han River to invade Henan from the south.

The main Jin army promptly marched to intercept Subutai's army at Mount Yu. Its commander, Wan Yen Heda attempted to ambush the Mongols, but the ambush was detected. In turn, the Mongols attempted to draw him into their own ambush with a feigned retreat, but he held his strong position. After a full day of fierce fighting that resulted in a stalemate, the Mongols retreated under darkness and attempted to hide their trail and outflank the Jin. Wan Yen Heda had retreated towards the city of Tengzhou in order to obtain supplies. Changing tracks, Subutai, identifying that the Jin were vulnerable to attrition, used a feint attack to temporarily divert the Jin forces away from their supply train, which he promptly seized with a hidden force. Rather than continually attempting to attack the vigilant Jin during their retreat, Subutai instead dispersed his army into several detachments to target supplies in the area. 3,000 men masked the Mongol dispersion and occupied the Jin's attention, while other Mongol forces slowly slipped away from the field in small numbers to hide their movements towards the Jin capital of Kaifeng, the route that Wan Yen Heda was retreating along.

With part of his force harassing the Jin army's foragers, the other units marched around the flanks in a wide arc and emerged ahead of the Jin army, aiming to destroy or steal the supplies of nearby villages along the Jin's line of retreat. Ogedei Khan had been able to cross the Yellow River after the Jin army blocking him had to march south to help Wan Yan Heda. With Subutai's army having maneuvered along the Jin rear, Ogedei was able to send reinforcements to Subutai, bringing the total Mongol strength to 50,000 men. After these reinforcements arrived and with the Jin army's food supplies severely depleted over the past three weeks, Subutai forced a battle on his terms and won a decisive victory at the Battle of Sanfengshan, capturing Wan Yen Heda and annihilating the main Jin army which had nowhere safe to retreat to. He then made forced marches and eliminated the other Jin armies holding the other fronts at the battles of Yangyi (24 February 1232), and T’iehling (1 March 1232).

The heavily fortified city of Kaifeng required an eight month long siege. Subutai was forced to construct lines of circumvallation that had a perimeter stretching 87 km (54 mi). Additionally, the Jin began to employ a cutting edge gunpowder weapon called "Thunder Crash Bombs", which made it very difficult for the Mongols to get close enough for more concentrated fire. After cutting off Kaifeng from any outside help, Subutai alternated intense bombardments using a mixture of Muslim trebuchets, mangonels, and captured gunpowder with periods of rest and plundering the countryside. The Mongol dispersion helped them avoid contagion by the plague that devastated Kaifeng, and after being stretched to the limit, the Emperor fled and the city surrendered. Subutai originally wanted to execute everyone in Kaifeng to punish them for their intransigence and extremely long resistance. However, Ögedei intervened and ordered Subutai to treat them fairly. With assistance from the Song dynasty, the last Jin stronghold of Caizhou fell in 1234.

However, it did not take the Song long to fall out with the Mongols. Two Song armies seized Kaifeng and Luoyang during the summer of 1234 during Subutai's absence. Subutai returned, destroyed the three Song armies by isolating and defeating them, and retook the cities. He then made a preemptive raid into Song territory to force them to adopt a defensive position. Though war had begun between the Mongols and Song, Subutai was recalled to the west. Still, Subutai's victories had taught the Song a lesson they would heed: no Song army would dare venture north to attack Mongol territory afterward.

== Conquest of Rus' (1236–1240) ==
Ögedei decided to send a major part of the army into the western regions to finally crush the Wild Kipchaks and Bulgars. Subutai was tasked to direct the operations (under the overall command of prince Batu). This mission was more than just a typical invasion: Ögedei sent many of the next generation of Mongol princes, including the heirs of each of the four families, most likely to be trained by Subutai before he died. In order to crush the Volga Bulgars, who had previously defeated Batu in 1232, Subutai launched another giant encirclement campaign. The Mongols marched up the Volga river in a wide arc on the west side. However, this force was just to occupy their attention, for he sent a secondary army to surprise the Bulgars from the east by crossing the Ural mountains. After squashing the Bulgar armies, he defeated the guerrilla leader Bachman on the north side of the Caspian Sea. Bachman had ensconced himself on an island, and taunted the Mongols. However, they constructed a mini-navy of 200 boats, trapped Bachman within a limited area, and gradually closed the 'net'.

Unlike in 1222–1223, when the majority of the Rus' states allied against Subutai and Jebe, this time the Mongols apparently struck with such speed that the Rus' were either too paralyzed, or possibly too bitter or distracted to ally. In late 1237, Subutai attacked Ryazan and Vladimir-Suzdal, operating with three columns (attacking as the Mongols usually did during the winter, when the rivers froze over). The Rus forces were defeated in 3 separate engagements and their cities were taken in quick succession. The Mongols spent the summer of 1238 resting along the Don River. Columns were sent out to subjugate the various tribes living in the plains around the Black Sea. In 1239, the Rus' state of Chernigov was defeated and its cities were taken. The Mongols were spared the need to conquer Novgorod when the principality surrendered, agreed to pay tribute in the future, and gave the Mongols a large bribe.

The most notable encounter of the campaign was the Battle of the Sit River in 1238. The Grand Duke Yuri of Vladimir, the most prominent of the Rus' leaders, had left Vladimir to raise an army and defeat the Mongols before they reached his city. However, the Mongols evaded his army and captured Vladimir before he even knew what had happened. When Yuri sent out a strong reconnaissance force to penetrate the Mongol scouting screen, his lieutenant told him in horror that his army was already entirely surrounded. Not surprisingly, Yuri and his army were easily defeated. The Mongols had made a treaty with Galicia-Volhynia, whose prince was therefore taken by surprise when the Mongols suddenly attacked in December 1240. Kiev, Vladimir, and other cities were quickly taken.

== Invasion of Central Europe (1241–1242) ==
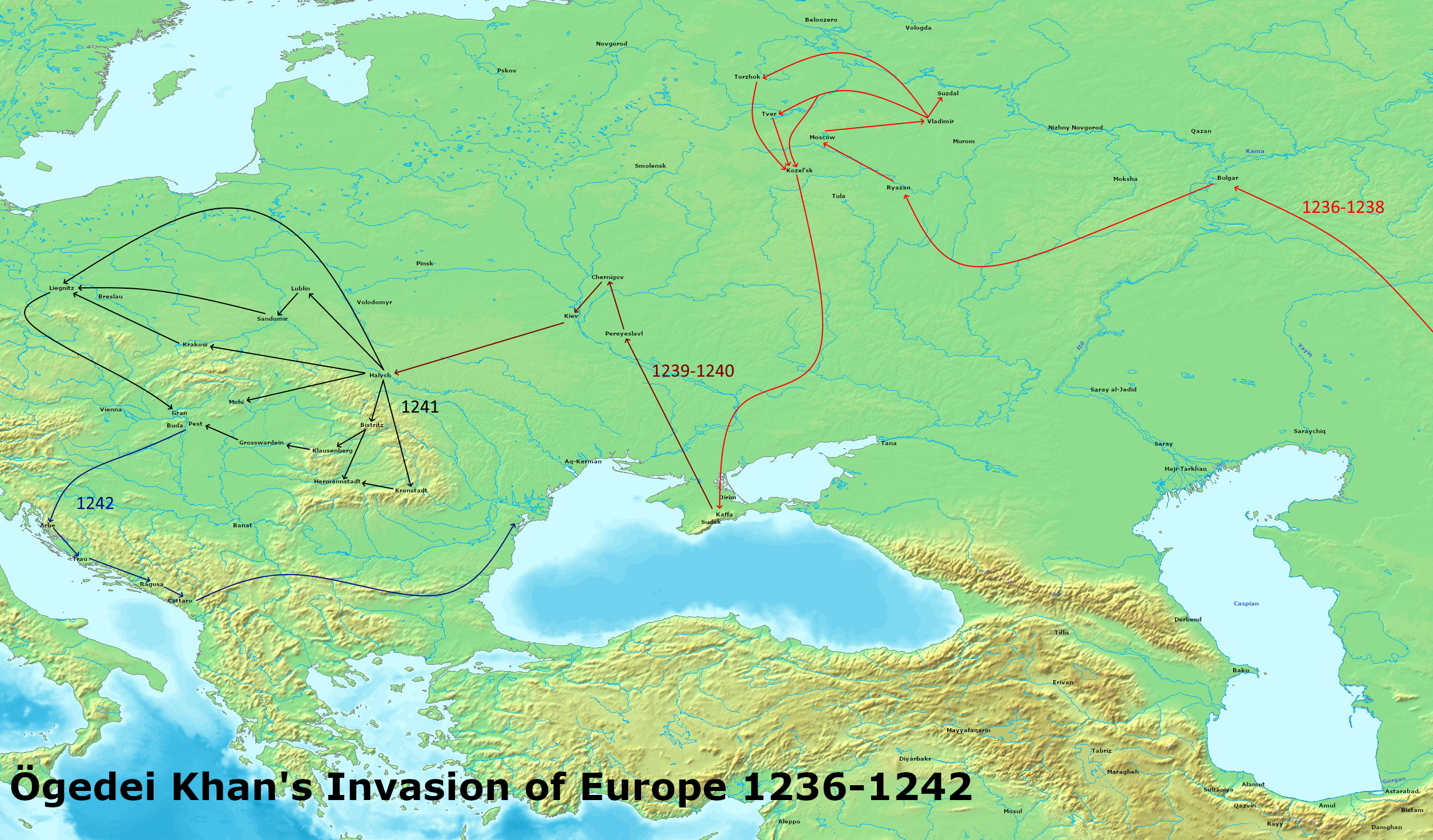
Mongol invasion of Europe 1236–1242

The attack on Europe was planned and carried out by Subutai, who achieved his lasting fame with his victories there. Having devastated the various Russian principalities, he sent spies as far as Poland, Hungary, and Austria in preparation for an attack into the heartland of Europe. Having a clear picture of the European kingdoms, he brilliantly prepared an attack nominally commanded by Batu Khan and two other princes of the blood. While Batu Khan, son of Jochi, was the overall leader, Subutai was the actual commander in the field, and as such was present in both the northern and southern campaigns against Kievan Rus'. He personally commanded the central column that moved against the Kingdom of Hungary, and likely gave detailed instructions to his subordinates.

Though the Mongol methods of warfare were mostly a mystery in the west, the King of Hungary, Bela IV, was well-informed of the Mongol invasion of Russia and prepared as well as the fractured relations of Europe would allow him to. Though Bela was unable to obtain help from the Holy Roman Empire or the Pope, he did at least have the support of his cousins in Poland. Once again, Subutai invaded during winter, when they would be least expected. The Mongol invasion of Europe was a five-pronged attack. Kaidu and Orda Khan ravaged Northern Poland, Baidar Southern Poland, while Shiban attacked through the rugged terrain in northeastern Hungary, Subutai and Batu invaded central Hungary, and Guyuk marched south through Transylvania. The Mongols dispersed their forces in order to confuse the Europeans as to their ultimate objectives, and defeat the European armies piecemeal before they could mass into a central force. After a series of sweeping victories Baidar and Kadan regrouped their northern force and defeated the main Polish army at the Battle of Legnica, right before it could merge with the Bohemian Army a days march away. While Güyük's army triumphed in Transylvania, a day after Legnica, Subutai was waiting for the Hungarian army on the Hungarian plain. Though the Hungarian King Bela IV had effectively blocked the Carpathian passes using felled trees, ditches, traps, and other natural obstacles, in addition to the general disrepair or simple nonexistence of roads in eastern Hungary, Subutai's force still managed an astonishing pace of 100 km (60 mi) a day despite several feet of snow. The Mongols retained a pioneer corps capable of efficiently clearing pathways through the forest, and were unfazed by Bela's obstacles.

Only one day after the smaller Mongol army in Poland had won the Battle of Legnica, Subutai launched his attack, thus beginning the Battle of Mohi during the night of 10 April 1241. At Mohi, the Mongols fixated the Hungarian attention in the center by assaulting the lone bridge and attempting to ford to the north and around the bridge. The main body began to cross the Sajo by the bridge at Mohi, and continued to attack the following day. This was met with fierce resistance, so catapults were used to clear the opposite bank of crossbowmen, as was noted earlier. Meanwhile, Subutai in secret created a pontoon bridge to the south, where the river was too deep to be forded, and crossed the river in secret with a large force. When the crossing was completed, the second contingent attacked from the south, and a third from the north. The threat of now reassembled Mongol force, enveloping the Hungarian army on the far side of the Sajo river, forced the Hungarians to retreat into their wagon laager camp, a traditional tool of fighting against nomadic armies. However, the Mongols surrounded the fortified Hungarian camp, and bombarded it with trebuchets, gunpowder weapons, and flaming arrows. Hungarian cavalry charges were lured further away from their camp and encircled.

The result was complete panic; and to ensure that the Hungarians did not fight to the last man, the Mongols left an obvious gap in their encirclement. This was one of Subutai's classic tricks, to create a tactical situation which appeared to be favourable to the enemy. Subutai did not want a battle where the massed crossbowmen, supported by mounted knights, stood firm and fought to the death against his army. He far preferred to let them flee and be slaughtered individually. The apparent gap in the Mongol lines was an invitation to retreat, which would leave the knights and crossbowmen spread out all over the countryside, easy pickings for the disciplined Mongols. As Subutai had planned, the Hungarians poured through this 'hole' in the Mongol lines, which led to a swampy area, poor footing for horses and hard going for infantry. When the Hungarian knights split up, the Mongol archers picked them off at will. It was later noted that corpses littered the countryside over the space of a two-day journey. Two archbishops and three bishops were killed at the Sajo, plus more than 10,000 fighting men. In one stroke, the bulk of Hungarian fighting men were totally destroyed, but Mongol casualties in the center had been higher than normal: in addition to anywhere from many hundreds to many thousands of regular soldiers, Batu lost 30 of his 4,000 strong ba'aaturs (heavily armored bodyguards) and one of his lieutenants (Bagatu/Bakatu), which caused tension later in the camp.

=== Mongol subjugation of Hungary ===
In addition to defeating the enemy, Subutai also had to spend substantial energy keeping the egos of the Mongol princes in check during the Hungarian campaign. During the battle, Subutai had to shame Batu into continuing the fight after the first failed attack on the bridge. Batu first blamed Subutai for taking too long to ford the river, but Subutai rebuffed him by saying that they knew fording the river would take time, and Batu had launched his attack preemptively. In the end Batu apologized to Subutai. This was not the first time that Subutai had to bail Batu out of a mistake: during the invasion of Russia, Batu had struggled for weeks to conquer the fortress of Torzhok, launching several failed assaults. Subutai had to divert his movements, take command, and conquered the fortress in three days with ease. Either at this feast or another one shortly after, Batu got into a heated argument with the Mongol princes Guyuk and Buri. Guyuk and Buri, jealous of Batu, accused Batu of incompetence and riding Subutai's coattails. This resulted in Guyuk and Batu, and possibly some of their men being sent home to Ögedei Khan for judgment, causing further rifts in the Mongol army.

Despite these obstacles, the Mongols still attempted to solidify their control over Hungary. From Rogerius' writings it would seem that scattered resistance by the peasantry was attempted, but it never really got off the ground, perhaps in part due to the flat open plains of central Hungary allowing scant opportunity for ambush or withdrawal. After the defeat of the Hungarians at Mohi, Subutai used a stolen royal seal to issue bogus decrees across the country, leaving many unassuming inhabitants at his mercy.

In order to keep the pressure on Bela, Subutai split his forces into several detachments. A light cavalry force under Kadan was sent to chase King Bela along the Adriatic Coast, while the main army with its siege engines under Subutai and Batu attempted to pacify Hungary proper. Other Mongol forces raided outside the borders of Hungary, even reaching Austria before being repulsed in a skirmish near Wiener Neustadt. The Mongols successfully besieged several cities, including the fortified city at Oradea, the castle of St. Martin of Pannonia, and the capital Esztergom, though the latter's stone citadel held out, and not all sieges proved successful.

By early 1242, Subutai was discussing plans to invade the Holy Roman Empire, when news came of the death of Ögedei Khan and a revolt by the Cumans in Russia. Carpini alleges that, over the objections of Subutai, the Mongol princes withdrew the army to Mongolia for the election of a new Great Khan. This account of events is disputed, with Rashid al-Din specifically noting that Batu and Subutai only heard of the Khan's death after they had already begun the withdrawal. However, the death of Ogedei and the turmoil immediately after it prevented the Mongols from returning to Europe for decades. Still, the devastation had been immense. Subutai had devastated the agriculture of any area that was resisting. Though some of the civilians had escaped capture or death by hiding in castles, forests, or marshes, they returned to their ruined fields only to starve. Some historians have claimed that a quarter to a half of Hungary's population may have died from the invasion. Even in 1250, eight years after the Mongols had left, Hungarian King Bela wrote to Pope Innocent IV that Hungary could not withstand another invasion and would have to surrender to the Mongols if they returned.

== Final years ==
After subduing a Cuman revolt in what is now Russia, Subutai turned towards Mongolia. Subutai insisted that Batu attend the kurultai to elect the successor of Ogedei in the Mongolian heartland. Batu declined to come and Güyük was elected after three years, with Subutai's support. Güyük had no love for Batu and wanted the best of the Mongol generals to be made unavailable to Batu if the feud between them came to open war. The new Khagan placed Subutai in charge, at the age of 71, of the campaign against the Song dynasty for 1246–1247. The papal envoy Plano Carpini saw him when he was in Karakorum, Mongolia. He said Subutai was well respected among the Mongols and called him a Knight/Valiant/Hero (translation of Baghatur). Subutai returned to Mongolia from the Song campaign in 1248 and spent the remainder of his life at his home in the vicinity of the Tuul River (near modern Ulaanbaatar), dying there at the age of 72. A folk legend claimed that Subutai wished to die by his son Uriyangkhadai by the banks of the Danube river.

Subutai's descendants such as Uriyangkhadai and Aju would serve the Great Khans for the next three decades as commanders. Uriyangkhadai would successfully conquer the Dali Kingdom, but not Đại Việt however. He later achieved great success invading Song China from the southwest in the 1258 invasion of Möngke Khan. Aju fought with his father, and then later led the successful five-year Mongol siege of the pivotal dual fortress of Xiangyang-Fancheng in the Battle of Xiangyang, which opened up a gateway into the heart of the Song and enabled their total conquest six years later in 1279.

== Legacy ==
"No Mongol general played a greater role than Subotei Ba'atur in establishing and maintaining the early Mongol Empire. Trusted commander and retainer of Chinggis, later highly respected servant of Ogodei and Guyuk, Subotei served with great distinction in every phase of Mongolian national development during the first four decades of empire. When he first entered the service of Temujin, the later Cinggis Qan, the realm of that minor Mongol chieftain comprised only a few families. In his old age, Subotei saw a mighty dominion stretching from the borders of Hungary to the Sea of Japan, from the outskirts of Novgorod to the Persian Gulf and the Yangtze River. He had no small part in creating it."

— Paul Buell

In a unique historical anomaly, the strategic and operational innovations of Genghis Khan and Subutai became lost in history, and others were forced to rediscover them 600 and 700 years later. Even though Subutai had devastated the armies of Russia, Georgia, Hungary, Poland, Bulgaria, and Latin Constantinople in a series of one-sided campaigns, Western military leaders, historians, and theorists completely ignored him until the 20th century. The Mongols did not operate as one distinct mass, but instead moved along 3–5 axes of approach, often 500–1000 km apart, and threatened numerous objectives simultaneously. Like Napoleon, Subutai (and Genghis Khan) would disperse their forces along a wide frontage and rapidly coalesce at decisive points to defeat the enemy in detail. Their methods were aligned to completely crush the enemy state's will to fight. Subutai has been credited as the first general to operate campaigns using the modern organizational methods of command and control.

Though unknown to the west for many centuries, Subutai's exploits were featured by the British military theorist B. H. Liddell Hart in his book Great Captains Unveiled after World War I. Liddell Hart used the example of the Mongols under Genghis and Subutai to demonstrate how a mechanized army could fight using the principles of mobility, dispersion and surprise. Due to his innovative battle tactics and novelty in strategy he is a source of inspiration for later generals. In particular, Erwin Rommel and George Patton were avid students of Mongol campaigns.

=== Deep battle theory ===
Russia derived the most use out of a careful study of the Mongol campaigns. Their closer proximity to the steppe gave them greater interest and access to the Mongolian campaigns, first analyzed by the Russian General Mikhail Ivanin in the 19th century, which became a recommended text in the Russian military academies up until the mid 20th century. Ivanin's work became used in the deep battle doctrine developed by Soviet Marshal Mikhail Tukhachevsky, Mikhail Frunze, and Georgii Isserson. Deep Battle doctrine bore a heavy resemblance to Mongol strategic methods, substituting tanks, motorized troop carriers, artillery, and airplanes for Mongol horse archers, lancers, and field artillery. The Red Army even went so far as to copy Subutai's use of smokescreens on the battlefield to cover troop movements. Later in the 20th century, American military theorist John Boyd and some of his followers used Genghis Khan and Subutai's campaigns as examples of maneuver warfare.

== Descendants of Jarchiudai ==
- Jarchiudai ebügen
  - Jelme
    - Yösübukha
    - Yösüntege
  - Sübeedei
    - Uriyangkhadai
      - Kökötei
      - Aju
        - Bürilgitei

== Historical fiction ==
- Until the Sun Falls by Cecelia Holland (1969)
- The Snow Warrior by Don Dandrea (1988)
- Conqueror series by Conn Iggulden (2007, 2008, 2008, 2010, 2011)
- The Mongoliad series by Neal Stephenson, Erik Bear, Greg Bear, Joseph Brassey, Nicole Galland (aka E.D. deBirmingham), Cooper Moo, Mark Teppo and others, including fans. (2010–2014)
- The Red Blades of Black Cathay by Robert Erwin Howard (February–March 1931)
- গ্রহণকাল (2015) and its sequel পূর্ণগ্রহণ (2021) by Maitry Roy Moulik

== Bibliography ==
- Allsen, T. T., Prelude to the Western Campaigns: Mongol Military Operations in Volga-Ural Region 1217–1237, Archivum Eurasiae Medii Aevi 3 (pp. 5–24), 1983
- Amitai-Preiss, Reuven (1998). The Mamluk-Ilkhanid War. Cambridge University Press. ISBN 0-521-52290-0
- Boyle, John Andrew, History of the World Conqueror, Manchester, 1958
- de Rachewiltz, Igor, In the Service of the Khan: Eminent personalities of the early Mongol–Yuan period (1200–1300), Wiesbaden, 1992
- de Rachewiltz, Igor, The Secret History of the Mongols: A Mongolian Epic Chronicle of the Thirteenth Century, Brill, 2004
- Devi, Savitri, The Lightning and the Sun, 1958 (written 1948–56) ISBN 978-0-937944-14-1
- Gabriel, Richard A. (2004). Subotai the Valiant: Genghis Khan's Greatest General. Westport, Connecticut: Praeger Publishers. ISBN 0-275-97582-7.
- Laszlovszky, József & Pow, Stephen & Romhányi, Beatrix & Ferenczi, Laszlo & Pinke, Zsolt. (2018). Contextualizing the Mongol Invasion of Hungary in 1241–42: Short-and Long-Term Perspectives. 7. 419–450. (PDF) Contextualizing the Mongol Invasion of Hungary in 1241-42: Short-and Long-Term Perspectives *
- Morgan, David (1990). The Mongols. Oxford: Blackwell. ISBN 0-631-17563-6
- Nicolle, David (1998). The Mongol Warlords, Brockhampton Press.
- Pow, Stephen and Liao, Jingjing: Subutai – Sorting Fact from Fiction Surrounding the Mongol Empire’s Greatest General (With Translations of Subutai's Two Biographies in the Yuan Shi). Journal of Chinese Military History, Volume 7, Issue 1. Brill, Leiden, 2018, pp. 38–76.
- Stephen Pow: The Last Campaign and Death of Jebe Noyan. Journal of the Royal Asiatic Society 27, no. 01 (2016): 31–51.
- Reagan, Geoffry (1992). The Guinness Book of Decisive Battles, Canopy Books, NY.
- Saunders, J. J. (1971). The History of the Mongol Conquests, Routledge & Kegan Paul Ltd. ISBN 0-8122-1766-7
- Sicker, Martin (2000). The Islamic World in Ascendancy: From the Arab Conquests to the Siege of Vienna, Praeger Publishers.
- Soucek, Svatopluk (2000). A History of Inner Asia, Cambridge University Press.
- Strakosch-Grassmann, Einfall der Mongolen in Mittel-Europa 1241–1242, Innsbruck, 1893
- Sălăgean, Tudor. "1. The Mongol Invasion and Its Aftermath", (Leiden, Netherlands: Brill, 2016) doi: Transylvania in the Second Half of the Thirteenth Century
- Thackston, W. M., Rashiduddin Fazlullah’s Jamiʻuʾt-tawarikh (Compendium of Chronicles), Harvard University, Department of Near Eastern Languages and Civilizations, 1998–99
- Turnbull, Stephen (2003). Genghis Khan & the Mongol Conquests 1190–1400, Osprey Publishing. ISBN 1-84176-523-6
