= Battle of Khunan =

Battle in 1222

- Part of the Mongol invasions of Georgia
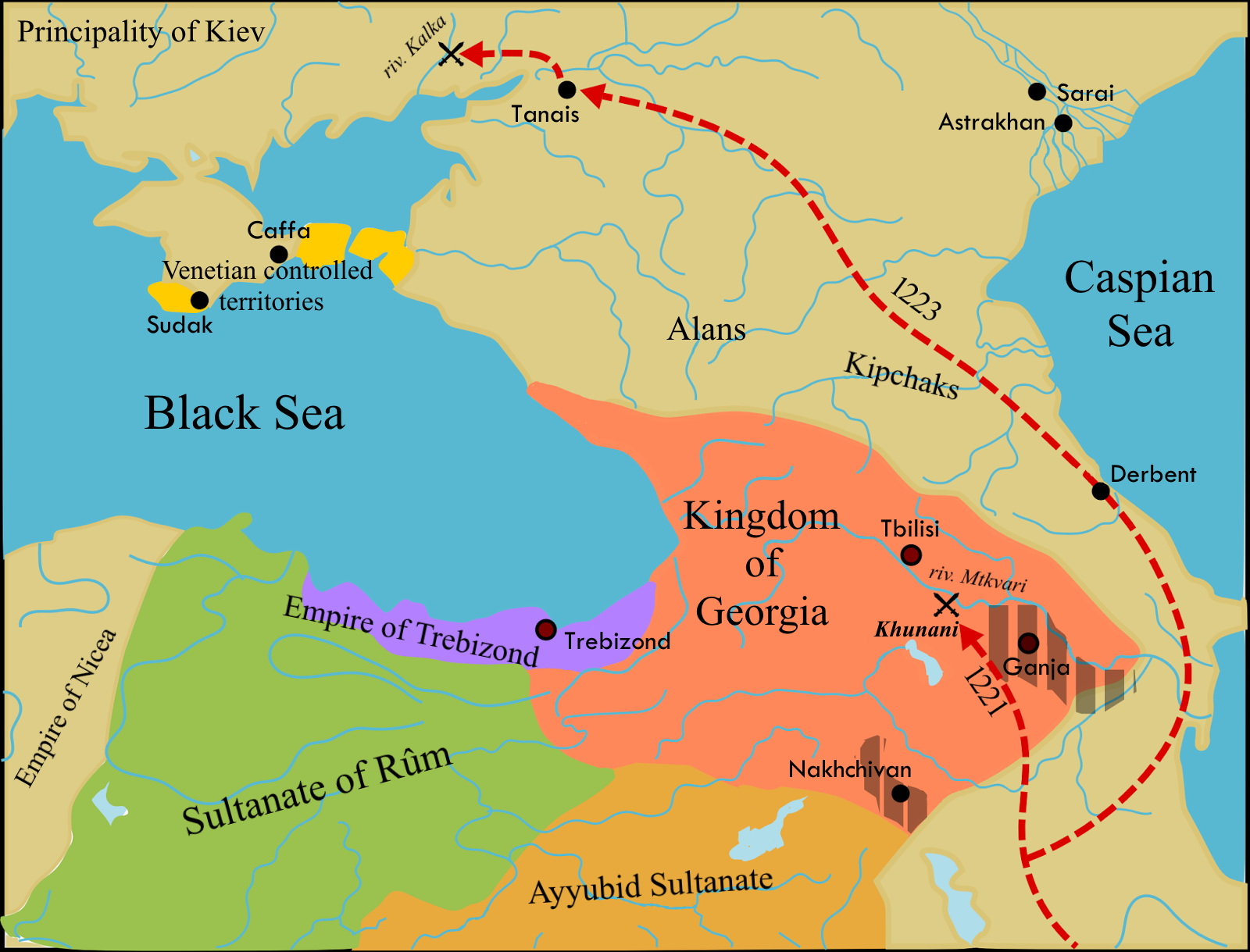
- Mongol invasion of Georgia and the Battle of Khunan
Date	September 1222
Location	Shemakha, Kingdom of Georgia 40°40′31″N 42°44′32″E
Result	Mongol victory

Belligerents
Mongol Empire	Kingdom of Georgia

Commanders and leaders
Subutai; Jebe	George IV

Strength
20,000 initially 30,000 Mongols and unknown number of allies at Khunan	10,000 initially 30,000 Georgians and Armenians at Khunan

Casualties and losses
Moderate	Heavy

The Battle of Khunan was fought in September 1222 between the Kingdom of Georgia, led by King George IV, and the Mongol army led by Subutai and Jebe. The result was a Mongol victory. For further details, see the Mongol Invasions of Georgia.

== Subutai's reconnaissance ==
The Mongols made their first appearance in the Georgian possessions when this latter kingdom was still in its zenith, dominating most of the Caucasus. First contact occurred early in the fall of 1220, when approximately 20,000 Mongols led by Subutai and Jebe pursued the ousted Shah Muhammad II of the Khwarazmian dynasty to the Caspian Sea. With the consent of Genghis Khan, the two Mongol generals proceeded west on a reconnaissance mission. The Mongols invaded from Nakhichevan, driving Atabeg Uzbek (ruler of the Eldiguzids, modern-day Azerbaijan) from Ganja in Azerbaijan to Tabriz. King George IV "Lasha" of Georgia hastily assembled an army of about 10,000 men including many Georgian crusaders commanded by him and his atabeg (tutor) Ivane Mkhargrdzeli, and managed to drive the invaders back but were consequently defeated in Armenia by successive Mongol counter-attacks. The Mongols then returned to Arran as they had not intended this as a war of conquest.

== Lead-up to the battle ==
Thinking that the Mongols would stay in Arran until the Spring, the Georgians began gathering an army, asking for help from Malik Ashraf of Ahlat and Uzbek, the Atabeg of Azerbaijan. Conquering the Caucasus was not Subatai's remit, but Mongol intelligence intercepted war plans by Georgia and their vassals, and the Mongols attacked when least expected, in the freezing cold and snowbound passes of January 1221. Subatai and Jebe received reinforcements from Genghis Khan and recruited local Turkish and Kurdish forces under the command of Akush, a disloyal underling of Atabag Uzbek. Subutai and Jebe then marched into Georgia towards Tbilisi, the Georgian Capital. Close to Tbilisi the Mongols attacked a Georgian force. The Georgians managed to defeat Akush's Turkmen but were beaten by the Mongol rearguard.

In spring, after ravaging Southeast Georgia, the Mongols withdrew to Karabakh, According to Kirakos Gandzaketsi, after this battle, Jebe and Subutai dwelt in a very safe place, which was between the cities of Barda and Beylagan. This they used as a base from which to launch attacks. Then they invaded Tabriz, whose governor Shams Tabrizi paid a fortune to buy the city exemption. In August 1221 the Mongols slaughtered the population of Hamadan, then turned north, depopulating Nakhichevan, Ardabil and Ganja, from where they went again to Eastern Georgia.

== Battle ==
This time King George IV and atabeg Mkhargrdzeli had assembled a larger force of 30,000 consisting of Georgians and Armenians, while Jebe had received reinforcements from Genghis. The two armies met on the plain of Khunan in September. Jebe set up an ambush with 5,000 cavalrymen while Subutai went forward with the rest of the army. The Mongol tactic was to attack with its main body and then feign a retreat, after which a second Mongol army descended from the rear to encircle and destroy the enemy. Unprepared for this tactic, the Georgians managed to disperse the initial Mongol charge with their heavy cavalry and chased them up to the river Kotman but Jebe's sudden advance from the ambush decided the battle in the Mongol's favor. The king and Ivane fled, leaving Prince Vahram Gageli to fight on the right flank, who survived and would later serve under Queen Rusudan.

== Aftermath ==
George IV was badly wounded in the chest; on 18 January 1223 he would die of his injuries. However subsequent invasions were cancelled when Mongol scouts discovered that the Georgians and Armenians were prepared to deny further incursions. Subutai instead continued to march his army north, with orders to conquer the Polovtsian Khanate.
