= Uriankhai =

Ethnic groups of Mongolia

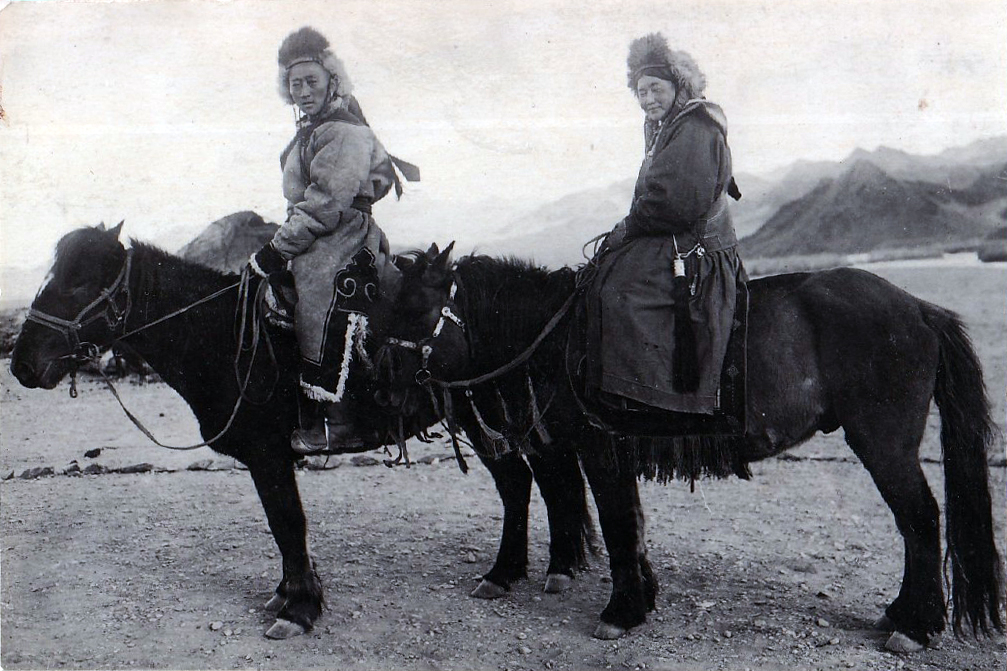
- Altai Uriankhai herders in Mongolia

Regions with significant populations
- Mongolia: 26,654 (2010 census)

Languages
- Oirat, Mongolian

Religion
- Buddhism, Mongolian shamanism, Atheism

Related ethnic groups
- Mongols, especially Oirats

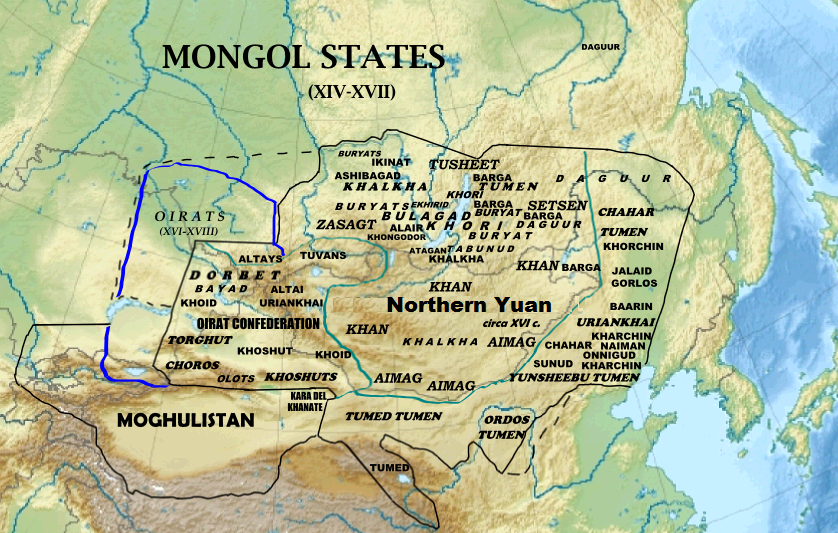
Mongol states: 1. Northern Yuan dynasty 2. Four Oirat 3. Moghulistan 4. Kara Del

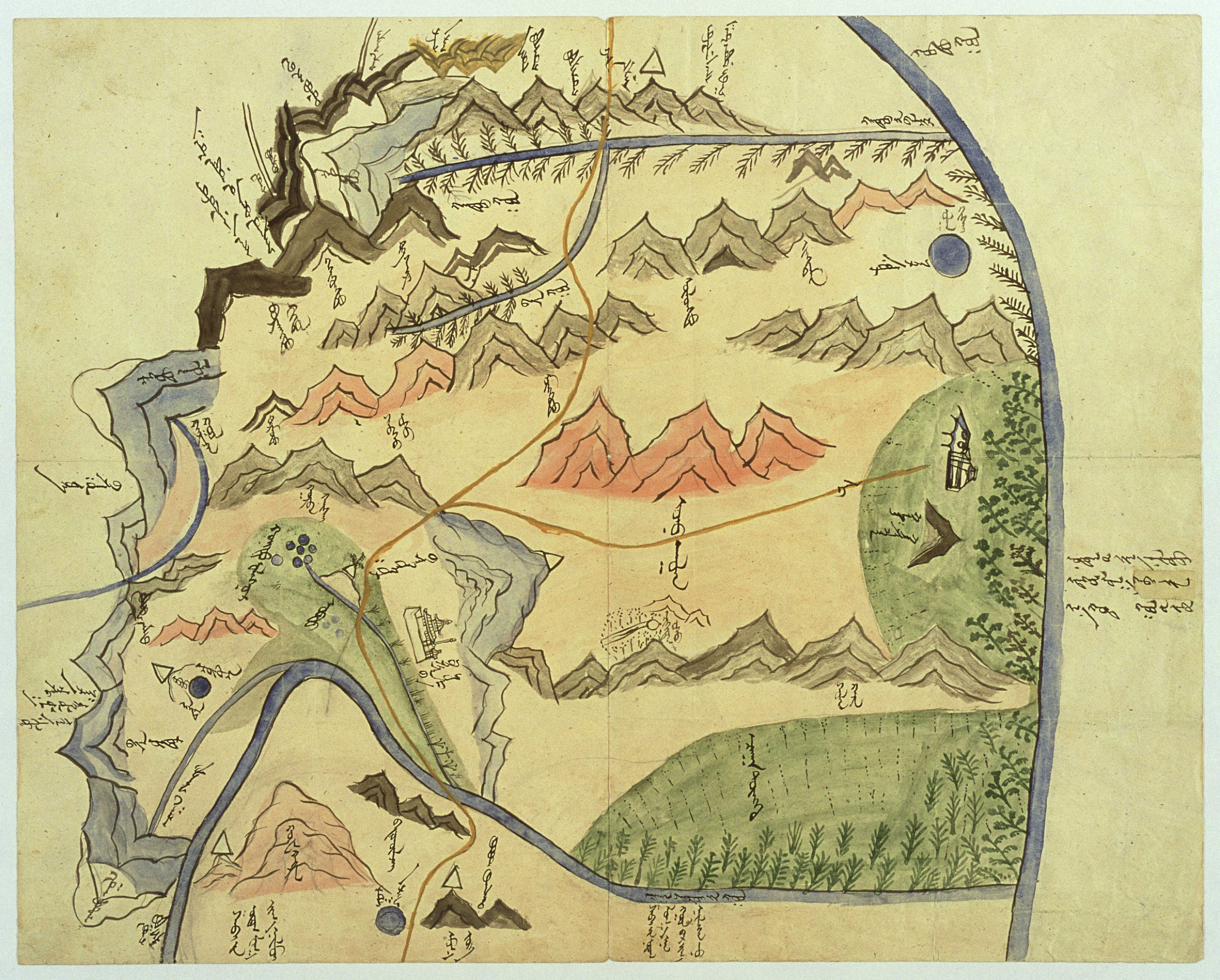
Map of the Jütgelt Gün's hoshuu (banner) of the Altai Uriankhai in western Mongolia.

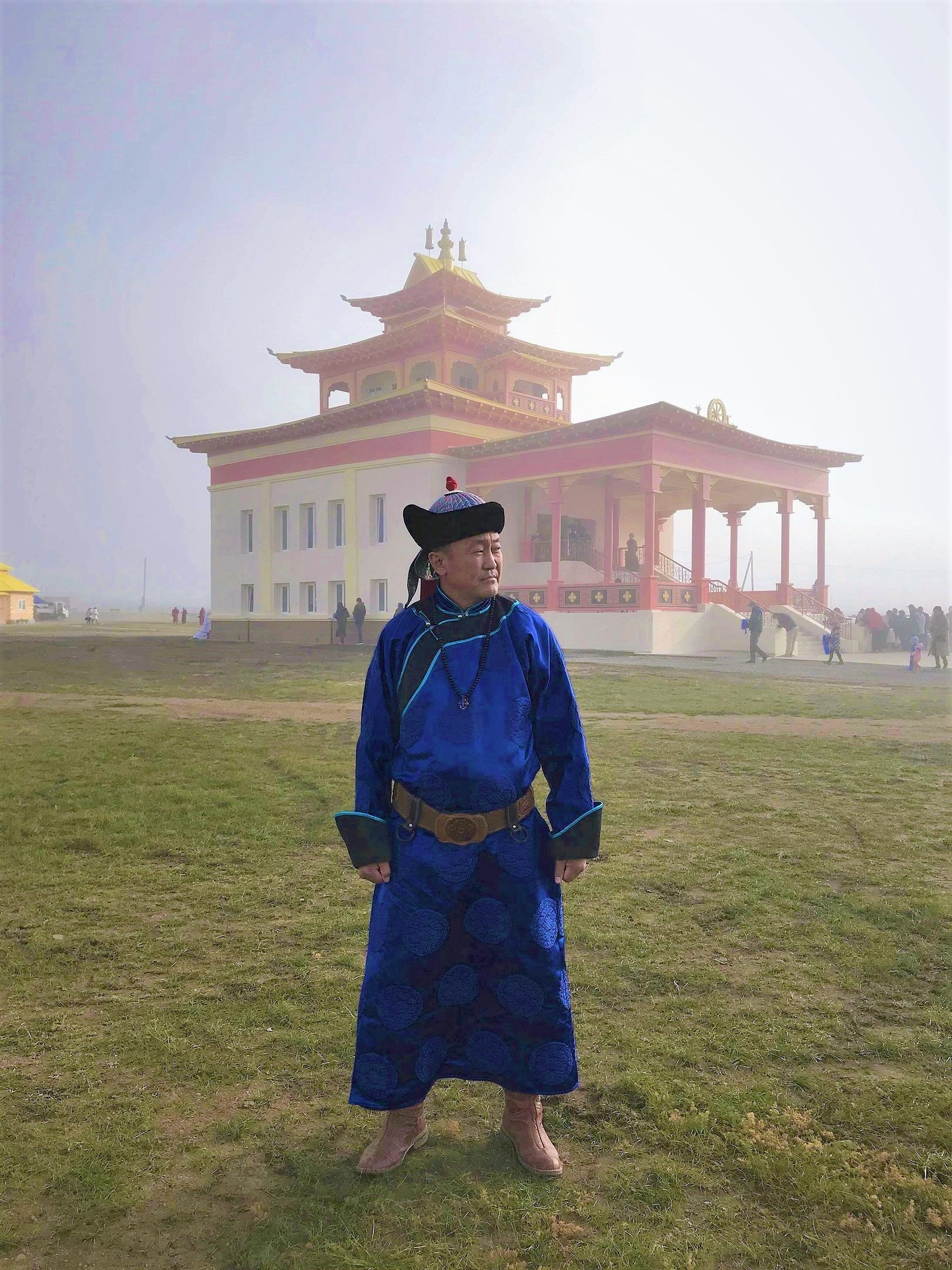
Buryat of the Uriankh-Songol clan

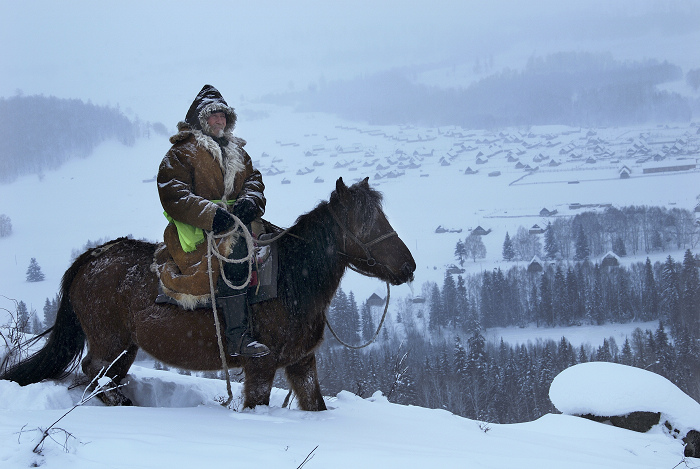
Tuvans or Tagnu Uriankhai

Uriankhai (/ˈʊriənˌxaɪ/ UUR-ee-ən-KHY) (Note: Mongolian: ᠤᠷᠢᠶᠠᠩᠬᠠᠢ / Урианхай, romanized: Uriankhai, pronounced [ˌo̙ɾʲæɴˈχæe̯]; Tuvan: Урааңкай, romanized: Urâñkay, pronounced [ʊɾäːɴˈqʰäɪ̯]; Altay: Ураҥкай, romanized: Urañqay, pronounced [ʊrɑɴˈqʰɑj]; Yakut: Урааҥхай, romanized: Urâñxay, pronounced [ʊɾɑːɴˈq͡χɑj]; traditional Chinese: 烏梁海; simplified Chinese: 乌梁海; pinyin: Wūliánghǎi) is a term applied by the Mongols to a group of forest peoples of the North, who include the Turkic-speaking Tuvans and Yakuts, while sometimes it is also applied to the Mongolian-speaking Altai Uriankhai. The Uriankhai included the western forest Uriankhai tribe and the Transbaikal Uriankhai tribe, with the former recorded in Chinese sources as Chinese: 兀良哈; pinyin: Wùliánghā.

== History ==
The name "Uriankhai' means "uria" (motto, war motto) and khan (lord) in Mongolian. The Mongols applied the name to all the forest peoples and, later, to Tuvans. They were classified by the Mongols as Darligin Mongols.

At the beginning of the Mongol Empire (1206–1368), the Uriankhai were located in central Mongolia.

In the 13th century, Rashid-al-Din Hamadani described the Forest Uriyankhai as extremely isolated Siberian forest people living in birch bark tents and hunting on skis. Despite the similarity in name to the famous Uriyankhan clan of the Mongols, Rashid states that they had no connection. After the fall of the Yuan Dynasty, the Jurchens were known among the Ming Chinese as "forest people" (using the Jurchen word, Woji), and this connotation later transferred to the Chinese rendering of Uriankhai, Wulianghai.

In the mid-14th century, there were two different tribes called Uriankhai, one located in Outer Mongolia and the other living in Liaoyang in Northeast China. The latter got its name from the fact that its ancestor Jelme came from Uriankhai. In 1375, Naghachu, Uriankhai leader of the Mongol-led Northern Yuan dynasty in Liaoyang, invaded the Liaodong Peninsula to restore the Mongols to power. Although he continued to hold southern Manchuria, the Ming military campaign against Naghachu ended with his surrender in 1387, and these Uriankhians known from historical sources as "Uriankhians of the three guards" (兀良哈三衛) in China.

On the other hand, the Uriankhai of the Khentii Mountains were conquered by Dayan Khan. After the rebellion of the northern Uriankhai people, Bodi Alagh Khan dissolved Uriankhai tumen in 1538 and it later mostly annexed by the Khalkha tumen. The northern Uriankhai groups lived in central Mongolia and they started moving to the Altai Mountains in the beginning of the 16th century. Some groups migrated from the Khentii Mountains to Khövsgöl Province during the course of the Northern Yuan dynasty (1368–1635).

Territories of the five Uriankhai banners (Khövsgöl Nuur, Tannu, Kemchik, Salchak, Tozhu) in the Qing Empire, 1911

By the early 17th century the term Uriankhai was a general Mongolian term for all the dispersed bands to the northwest, whether Samoyedic, Turkic, or Mongol in origin. In 1757 the Qing dynasty organized its far northern frontier into a series of Uriankhai banners: the Khövsgöl Nuur Uriankhai, Tannu Uriankhai; Kemchik, Salchak, and Tozhu (all Tuvans); and Altai people. Tuvans in Mongolia are called Monchoogo Uriankhai (cf. Tuvan Monchak < Kazakh monshak "necklace") by Mongolians. Another group of Uriankhai in Mongolia (in Bayan-Ölgii and Khovd Provinces) are called Altai Uriankhai. These were apparently attached to the Oirats. A third group of Mongolian Uriankhai were one of the 6 tumens of Dayan Khan in Eastern Mongolia. These last two Uriankhai groups are said to be descendants of the Uriankhan tribe from which came Jelme and his more famous cousin Subutai. The clan names of the Altai Uriankhai, Khövsgöl Nuur Uriankhai and Tuvans are different. There are no Turkic or Samoyedic clans among the Altai or Khövsgöl Uriankhais.

Some modern Uriankhais still live in the Khentii Mountains, Mongolia.

A variation of the name, Uraŋxai Sakha, was an old name for the Yakuts. Russian Pavel Nebolsin documented the Urankhu clan of Volga Kalmyks in the 1850s. The existence of the Uriankhai was documented by the Koreans, who called them by the borrowed name Orangkae (오랑캐, "savages"), especially in context of their attacks against the Siniticized world in the 14th and 15th centuries.

The Taowen, Huligai, and Wodolian Jurchen tribes lived in the area of Heilongjiang in Yilan during the Yuan dynasty when it was part of Liaoyang province and governed as a circuit. These tribes became the Jianzhou Jurchens in the Ming dynasty and the Taowen and Wodolian were mostly real Jurchens. In the Jin dynasty, the Jin Jurchens did not regard themselves as the same ethnicity as the Hurka people who became the Huligai. Uriangqa was used as a name in the 1300s by Jurchen migrants in Korea from Ilantumen because the Uriangqa influenced the people at Ilantumen. Bokujiang, Tuowulian, Woduolian, Huligai, Taowan separately made up 10,000 households and were the divisions used by the Yuan dynasty to govern the people along the Wusuli river and Songhua area.
