= Jelme =

Mongol general

Jelme (Mongolian: Зэлмэ, Zelme; c. 1160 – 1207) was a general and close companion of Genghis Khan. He was the older brother of Subutai and was of the Uriankhan clan. Jelme was appointed as leader of a Mingghan, or one thousand men.

== Biography ==
In the Secret History of the Mongols, Jelme is chronicled as having been given to Temujin (the name given to Genghis Khan at birth) when the latter was an infant, but was deemed too young, and sent back to his father. Jelme's father Jarchiudai again gives his son to Temujin when Temujin was meeting with the Wang Khan. The reason for Jelme's having been given to Genghis is unclear.

When Temujin was wounded by an arrow to the neck by his future general Jebe, Jelme saved his life by sucking the poisoned blood out. He further brought Temujin watered yoghurt (after failing to find milk) from the enemy's camp.

Jelme's worth to Genghis is exemplified by one of Genghis's proclamations, where Jelme is granted immunity from prosecution even if he commits nine crimes.
