= Jebe =

Mongol general under Genghis Khan

Noyan Jebe
- Зэв
- Died: Approximately 1224
- Other names: Jirqo'adai; Zurgadai; Зургаадай
- Military career
- Allegiance: Mongol Empire
- Conflicts: Battle of Chakirmaut; Battle of Yehuling; Battle of the Kalka River

Jebe

Chinese name
- Simplified Chinese: 哲别
Transcriptions
Standard Mandarin
- Hanyu Pinyin: Zhébié

Mongolian name
- Mongolian Cyrillic: Зэв ᠵᠡᠪᠡ
Transcriptions
- SASM/GNC: Jebe

Jebe (or Jebei, Mongolian: Зэв, pronounced as Zev; birth name: Jirqo'adai (Modern Mongolian: Zurgaadai), Mongolian: Зургаадай, Chinese: 哲别) (died approximately 1224) was one of the most prominent Noyans (generals) of Genghis Khan. He belonged to the Mongol Besüd tribe, and fought among the Tayichi'ut before entering Temüjin's service. Although Jebe was originally an enemy soldier, Genghis Khan recruited him and turned him into one of his greatest generals. Jebe played an important role in the expansion of the Mongol Empire. Despite his importance, there are relatively few sources or biographies about his life. Jebe has been described as "the greatest cavalry general in history" for his unorthodox and daring maneuvers.

== Life ==
In 1202, during the Battle of the Thirteen Sides, an arrow wounded Genghis Khan in the neck. His loyal subordinate, Jelme, cared for him. After winning the battle, he asked the defeated to reveal who shot his horse in the neck. This was a euphemism for his own injury in an attempt to conceal his injury or possibly to prevent false confessions. Jebe, known then as Jirqo'adai, voluntarily confessed and further added that it was Genghis's choice to kill him, but if allowed to live, would serve Genghis loyally. Genghis valued skill and loyalty. He thus pardoned and praised Jirqo'adai in this account. He then gave Jirqo'adai a new name, Jebe, which means both "arrow" and "weapon" in Mongolian.

Jebe quickly became one of Genghis Khan's best and most loyal commanders, rising to one of Genghis's top generals in just 3 years, and commanding the critical left army wing in the 1211 invasion of Jin China. His ability as a general put him on the level of Muqali and Subutai ba'atur. A Song emissary, Zhao Hong, noted that Jebe was considered to have the same level of authority as a third tier governor and commanded elite troops in Genghis's army. This can be attributed to many successful military achievements while he served under Genghis Khan.

=== War against Jin dynasty ===
He served with distinction in the initial war against Jin dynasty (1211–1214). During this first invasion, Jebe commanded the left wing with Subutai. His unit went around the wall to the east, capturing two fortresses. He then re-circled his tracks to destroy the second Jin army at Wusha Fortress and linked up with Genghis Khan's main army, who later went on to win the Battle of Yehuling. After this crushing victory, the Mongols took command of the passes that lead into the Beijing plains and continued to spread their control through the territory. Jebe was sent to capture numerous chains of fortresses, which he accomplished by using a feigned retreat to lure out defenders. Genghis seemed to rely on Jebe as his long ranged general: in winter 1211, Jebe was sent to capture Liaoyang, when Mongol forces had barely secured the great plains around Zhongdu. After riding several hundred miles away from the main battle front, Jebe lured the defenders of Liaoyang on a feigned retreat that lasted over 100 miles and left a large amount of Mongol booty on the ground. The Chinese troops paused to plunder it, and using the long nights of the northern winter, Jebe's army rode 100 miles in 24 hours to rout the disorderly Jin forces and seize Liaoyang.

In 1213, Genghis Khan sent Jebe to secure the heavily defended Juyong Pass. Jebe managed to find a mountain pass that enveloped the Jin fortifications, forcing the defenders to take the field. Jebe and Subutai then made forced marches the opposite way, retracing their steps and falling behind the enemy's new rear, encircling and liquidating this crucial army. After inciting a revolt in Manchuria and reducing a number of fortresses, Genghis split his army into five parts to raid vast swathes of Jin territory. Jebe was placed in the elite force under Muqali with Subutai, and they successfully raided the territory to the ocean while destroying or capturing many Jin towns and cities.

=== Battles against Kuchlug ===
In 1218, Jebe was tasked with defeating the perennial Mongol adversary Kuchlug and conquering Kara-Khitai. Given only 20,000 men, Jebe conserved manpower by inciting and backing religious revolts between the ruling Buddhists and oppressed Muslims. His forces moved with incredible alacrity which allowed him to overwhelm Kuchlug and his 30,000 men. Kuchlug was later hunted down after a long chase through the mountains. After Jebe scored victories over Kuchlug of Kara-Khitan, Genghis was said to be concerned. Although Genghis was glad of his general's victory, he was unsure if Jebe would demonstrate greater ambition and rebel against him. When word of this reached Jebe, he immediately returned to Genghis and offered 100 white horses (the same kind that Genghis Khan rode when Jebe wounded him) as a sign of loyalty and put any doubts to rest.

=== Invasion of Khwarezm Empire ===
During the invasion of the Khwarezm Empire in 1219, Jebe was sent with a diversionary force over the Tian Shan mountains during the winter to threaten the fertile Ferghana Valley. Jebe was able to navigate the tall mountain passes that had over five feet of snow, and he drew out Shah Mohammed II's elite 50,000 man cavalry reserve force. Jebe either won a victory or at least avoided defeat against this elite force and maneuvered further south to threaten Khorasan in order to cut off the far-away provinces. He then looped back to join Genghis Khan's main army at the capital Samarkand, effectively dividing Khwarezm into two. In order to prevent the Shah from rallying his forces in Khorasan and western Iran, Genghis dispatched Jebe and Subutai to hunt the Shah throughout his own empire. Though they ultimately failed to catch him, their close pursuit prevented the Shah from rallying any new armies and the Shah was forced to flee toward Iran with Jebe and Subutai in close behind. As a result, the Khwarezmian forces were spread out and destroyed gradually.

== Death ==
Jebe had made a legendary raid around the Caspian Sea where he and Subutai defeated the Georgians, who were set to join the Fifth Crusade, as well as the Caucasus Steppe tribes. He then later went on to defeat the Kievan Rus' and Cumans at the Battle of the Kalka River. He likely died shortly after the battle in approximately 1224. The circumstances surrounding his disappearance and death are mysterious. One scholar, Stephen Pow suggests that Jebe may have been killed by the Russian allied Kipchaks forces near a kurgan close to Khortytsia Island. The discrepancy behind this information may be a result of linguistic errors since the Turkic-speaking Kipchaks referred to Jebe as Gemya-Beg. Russian scholars D.M. Timokhin and V.V. Tishin questioned his views; they believe that the version of Stephen Pow is not proven on the basis of written sources and has absolutely no linguistic evidence.
