= Siege of Merv (1221) =

Seizure and destruction of Merv by the Mongol army

- Part of the Mongol invasion of Khorasan
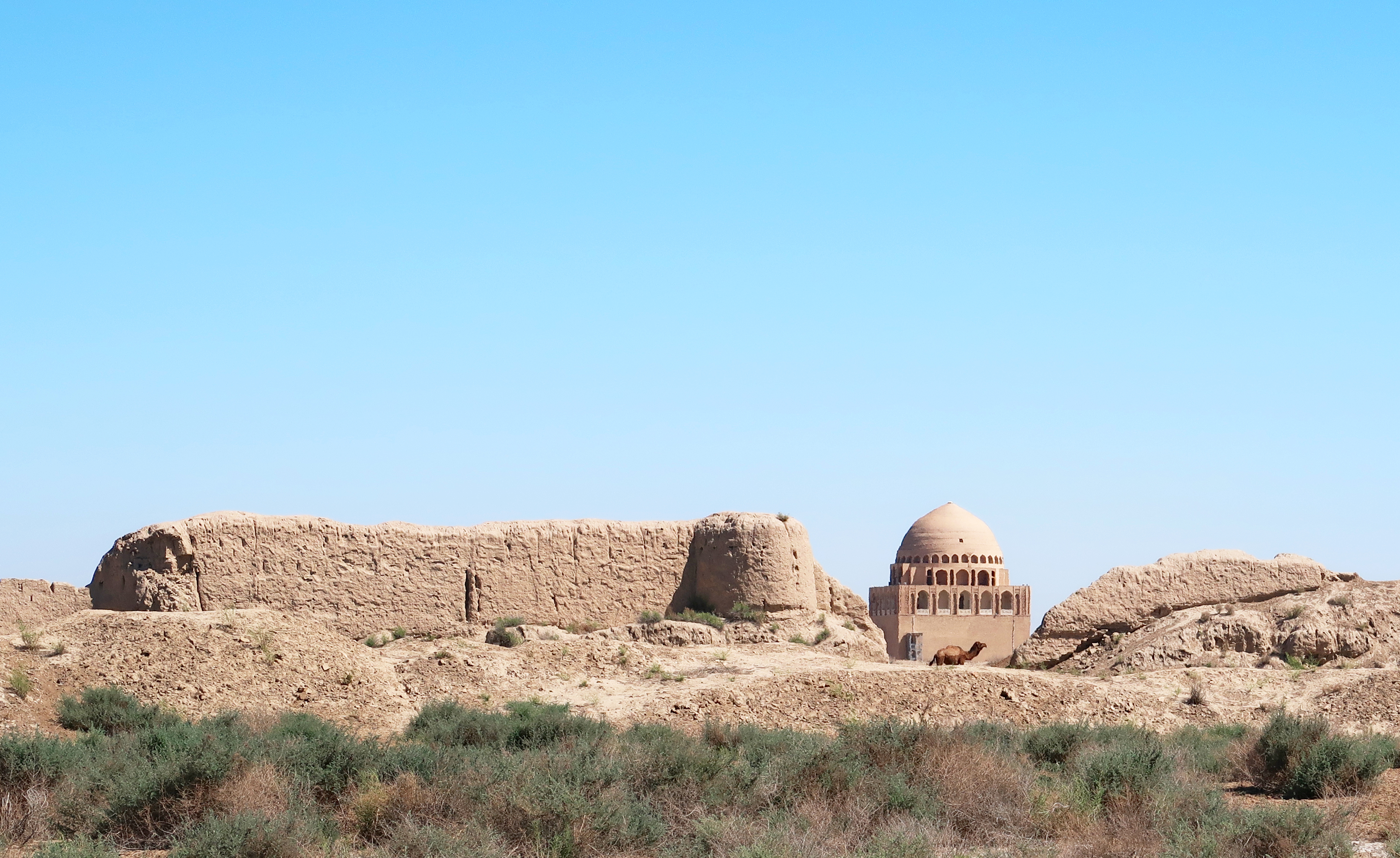
- The Walls of the city of Merv, which never recovered from the Mongol conquests; the tomb of Ahmad Sanjar can be seen through a gap in the ruined fortifications.
Date	April 1221
Location	Merv, Khwarazmian Empire, (present-day Turkmenistan) 37°39′46″N 62°11′33″E
Result	Mongol victory
Territorial changes	Merv captured by the Mongol Empire

Belligerents
Mongol Empire	Khwarazmian Empire

Commanders and leaders
Genghis Khan; Tolui	Dawud (governor)

Casualties and losses
Unknown	Heavy
- 700,000–1,300,000 civilians killed
- Location of the siege on a map of modern Turkmenistan Siege of Merv (West and Central Asia)

The siege of Merv (Persian: محاصره مرو) took place in April 1221, during the Mongol invasion of Khorasan. In 1219, Genghis Khan, ruler of the Mongol Empire, invaded the Khwarazmian Empire ruled by Shah Muhammad II. While the Shah planned to defend his major cities individually and divided his army to station in several garrisons, the Mongols laid siege to one town after another deep into Khorasan, heart of the Khwarazmian Empire.

The city of Merv was a major center of learning, trade and culture of Khorasan, then part of the extensive Khwarazmian Empire. A Mongol force, estimated to number between 30,000 and 50,000 men and led by Tolui, son of Genghis Khan, traversed the Karakum Desert after destroying the former imperial capital Gurganj in the north. According to several contemporary historians, Merv's defenders surrendered to Mongols within 7 to 10 days.

Historical accounts contend that Merv's entire population, including refugees, who had previously fled from other besieged towns of the empire, were killed. Mongols are reputed to have slaughtered 700,000 people, while Persian historian, Juvayni, as well as R. J. Rummel put the figure at more than 1,300,000, making it one of the bloodiest captures of a city in world history.

== Background ==
Merv, also formerly known as "Alexandria", "Antiochia in Margiana" and "Marw al-Shāhijān", was a major Iranian city on the historical Silk Road, situated in Khorasan. Capital of several polities throughout its rich history, Merv became the seat of the caliph al-Ma'mun and the capital of the entire Islamic caliphate in the beginning of the 9th century. In the 11th–12th centuries, Merv was the capital of the Great Seljuk Empire. Around this time, Merv turned into a chief centre of Islamic science and culture, attracting as well as producing renowned poets, musicians, physicians, mathematicians and astronomers.

Great Persian polymath Omar Khayyam, among others, spent a number of years working at the observatory in Merv. Persian geographer and traveller al-Istakhri wrote of Merv: "Of all the countries of Iran, these people were noted for their talents and education." Arab geographer Yaqut al-Hamawi counted as many as 10 giant libraries in Merv, including one within a major mosque that contained 12,000 volumes. During the 12th–13th centuries, just before the Mongol conquest, Merv may have been the world's largest city, with a population of up to 500,000. During this period, Merv was known as "Marw al-Shāhijān" (Merv the Great), and frequently referred to as the "capital of the eastern Islamic world". According to geographer Yaqut al-Hamawi, the city and its structures were visible from a day's journey away.

=== Prelude ===
There are conflicting reports as to the size of the total Mongol invasion force. The highest figures were calculated by classical Muslim historians such as Juzjani and Rashid al-Din. Modern scholars such as Morris Rossabi have indicated that the total Mongol invasion force cannot have been more than 200,000; John Masson Smith gives an estimates of around 130,000. The minimum figure of 75,000 is given by Carl Sverdrup, who hypothesizes that the tumen (the largest Mongol military unit) had often been overestimated in size. The Mongol armies arrived in Khwarazmia in waves: first, a vanguard led by Genghis' eldest son Jochi and the general Jebe crossed the Tien Shan passes, and started laying waste to the towns of the eastern Fergana Valley. Jochi's brothers Chagatai and Ogedai then descended on Otrar and besieged it. Genghis soon arrived with his youngest son Tolui, and split the invasion force into four divisions: while Chagatai and Ogedai were to remain besieging Otrar, Jochi was to head northwest in the direction of Gurganj. A minor detachment was also sent to take Khujand, but Genghis himself took Tolui and around half of the army—between 30,000 and 50,000 men—and headed westwards.

Campaigns of Genghis Khan between 1207 and 1225

The Khwarazmshah faced many problems. His empire was vast and newly formed, with a still-developing administration. His mother Terken Khatun still wielded substantial power in the realm—Peter Golden termed the relationship between the Shah and his mother "an uneasy diarchy", which often acted to Muhammad's disadvantage. The Shah distrusted most of his commanders, the only exception being his eldest son and heir Jalal al-Din, whose military skill had been critical at the Irghiz River skirmish the previous year. If the Khwarazmshah sought open battle, as many of his commanders wished, he would have been outmatched by the Mongol army, in both the size of the army and its skill. The Shah thus decided to distribute his forces as garrison troops in the empire's most important cities.

== Siege ==
The garrison at Merv was only about 12,000 men, and the city was inundated with refugees from eastern Khwarazm.

In April 1221, Tolui, son of Genghis Khan, besieged the city for six days. On the seventh day, he assaulted Merv. However, the garrison beat back the assault and launched their own counter-attack against the Mongols. The garrison force was similarly forced back into the city. The next day, the city's governor surrendered the city on Tolui's promise that the lives of the citizens would be spared. As soon as the city was handed over, however, Tolui slaughtered almost every person who surrendered, in a massacre possibly on a greater scale than that at Gurganj. The Afghan and Khalaj parts of the Mongol army led unimaginable tortures that "no man has ever seen the like." They lit citizens on fire, and exacted other torture methods. Arab historian Ibn al-Athir described the event basing his report on the narrative of Merv refugees:

Tolui Khan sat on a golden throne and ordered the troops who had been seized should be brought before him. When they were in front of him, they were executed and the people looked on and wept. When it came to the common people, they separated men, women, children and possessions. It was a memorable day for shrieking and weeping and wailing. They took the wealthy people and beat them and tortured them with all sorts of cruelties in the search for wealth ... Then they set fire to the city and burned the tomb of Sultan Sanjar and dug up his grave looking for money. They said, 'These people have resisted us' so they killed them all. Then Tolui Khan ordered that the dead should be counted and there were around 700,000 corpses.

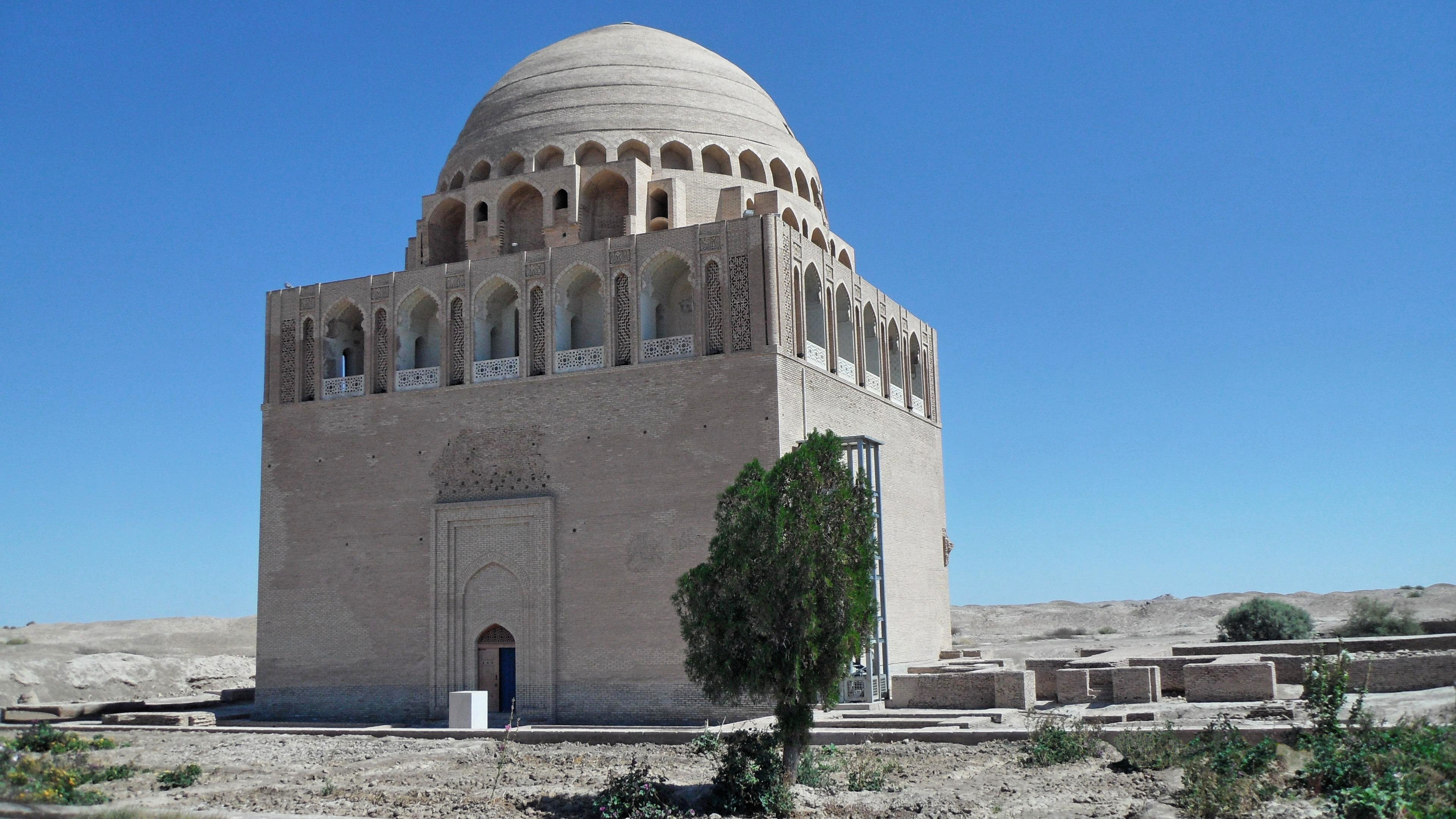
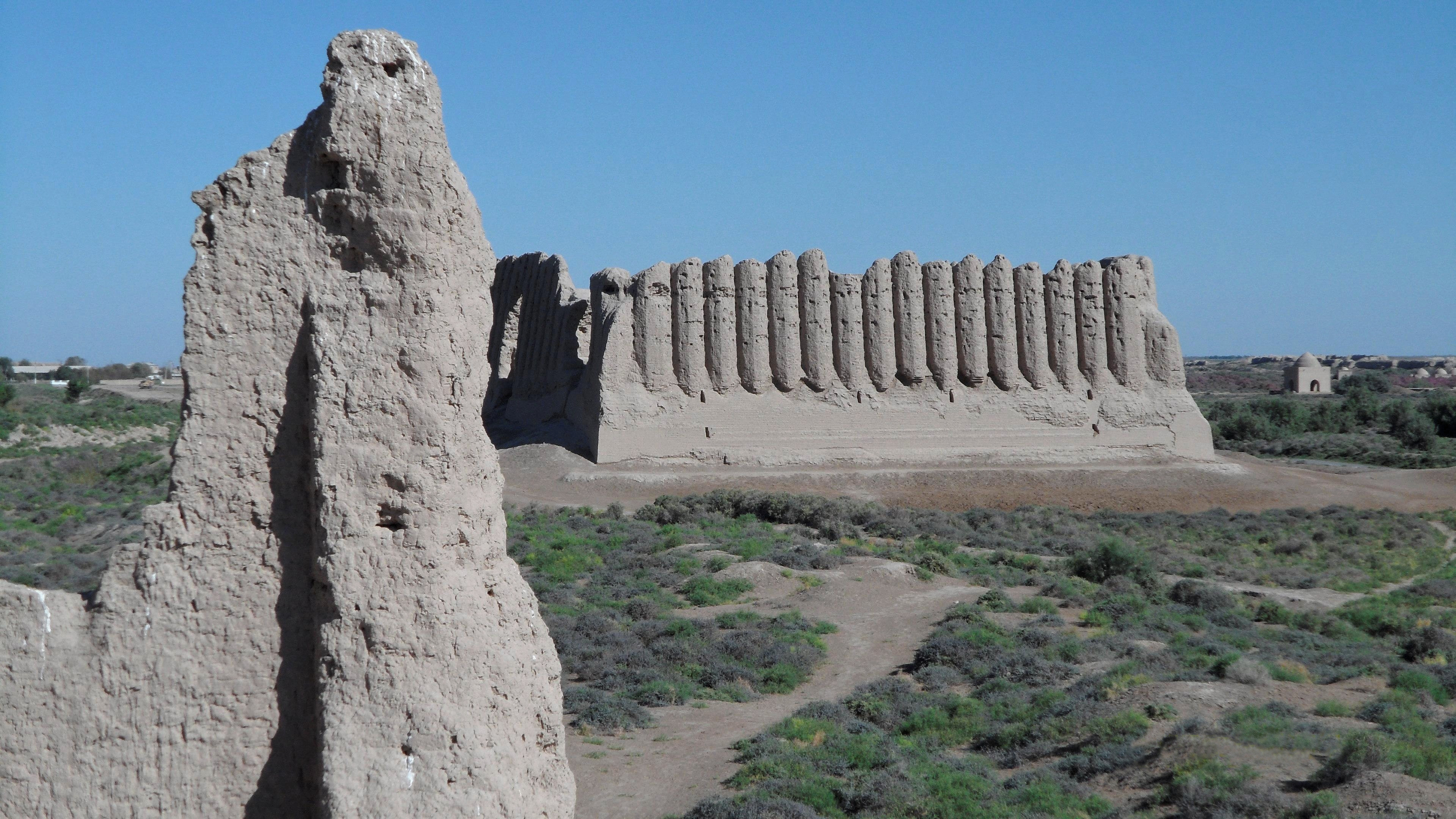
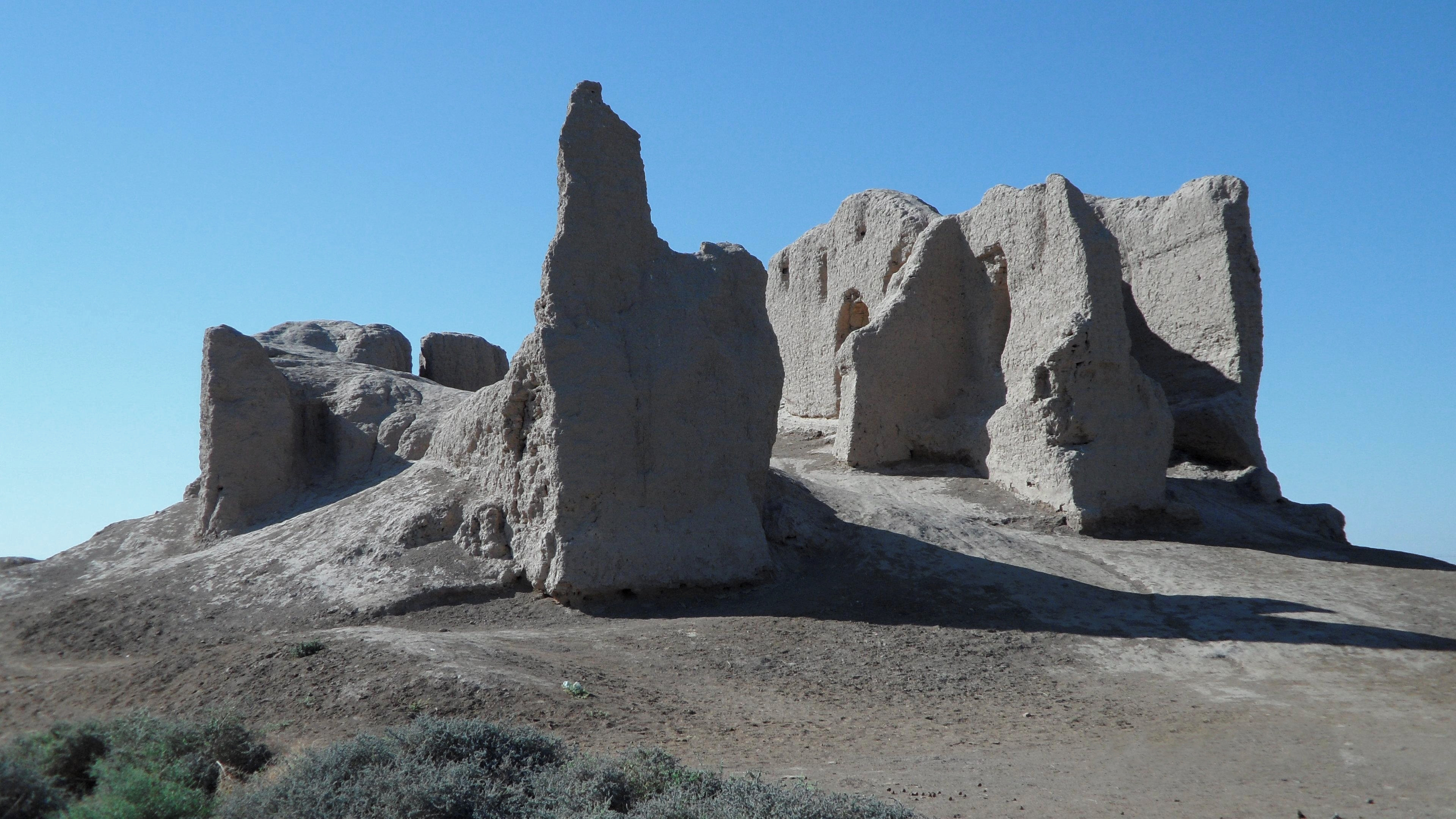
Buildings which survived the siege. Clockwise from top left: Seljuq sultan Ahmad Sanjar's mausoleum; Great Kyz Qala, and the Little Kyz qala.

A Persian historian, Juvayni, put the figure at more than 1,300,000. Each individual soldier of the conquering army "was allotted the execution of three to four hundred persons," many of those soldiers being levies from Sarakhs who, because of their town's enmity toward Merv, "exceeded the ferocity of the heathen Mongols in the slaughter of their fellow-Muslims." Almost the entire population of Merv, and refugees arriving from the other parts of the Khwarazmian Empire, were slaughtered, making it one of the bloodiest captures of a city in world history.

== Aftermath ==
Some time later in 1221, Khwarazmshah Jalal ad-Din attacked a detachment of Mongols near Wilan, which provoked Genghis Khan into sending an army of 30,000 troops under Shigi Qutuqu. As a result of the tactics adopted by Jalal ad-Din, the Mongol army was destroyed in a two-day battle. The Khwarazmians started an insurgency after the news of Shigi Qutuqu's defeat at the Battle of Parwan spread throughout the empire. Inspired by Jalal al-Din's back-to-back victories against the Mongol army, Kush Tegin Pahlawan led an insurgency in Merv and seized it successfully, followed by a successful attack on Bukhara.

Excavations revealed the drastic rebuilding of the city's fortifications in the aftermath of their destruction, but the city's prosperity had passed. The Mongol invasion spelled the eclipse of Merv and other major centres for more than a century. After the Mongol conquest, Merv became part of the Ilkhanate, and it was consistently looted by Chagatai Khanate. In the early part of the 14th century, the town became the seat of a Christian archbishopric of the Eastern Church under the rule of the Kartids, vassals of the Ilkhanids. By 1380, Merv belonged to the empire of Timur (Tamerlane).
