= Tomb of Ahmad Sanjar =

Mausoleum of the last Seljuk sultan

Coordinates: 37.6643°N 62.1637°E

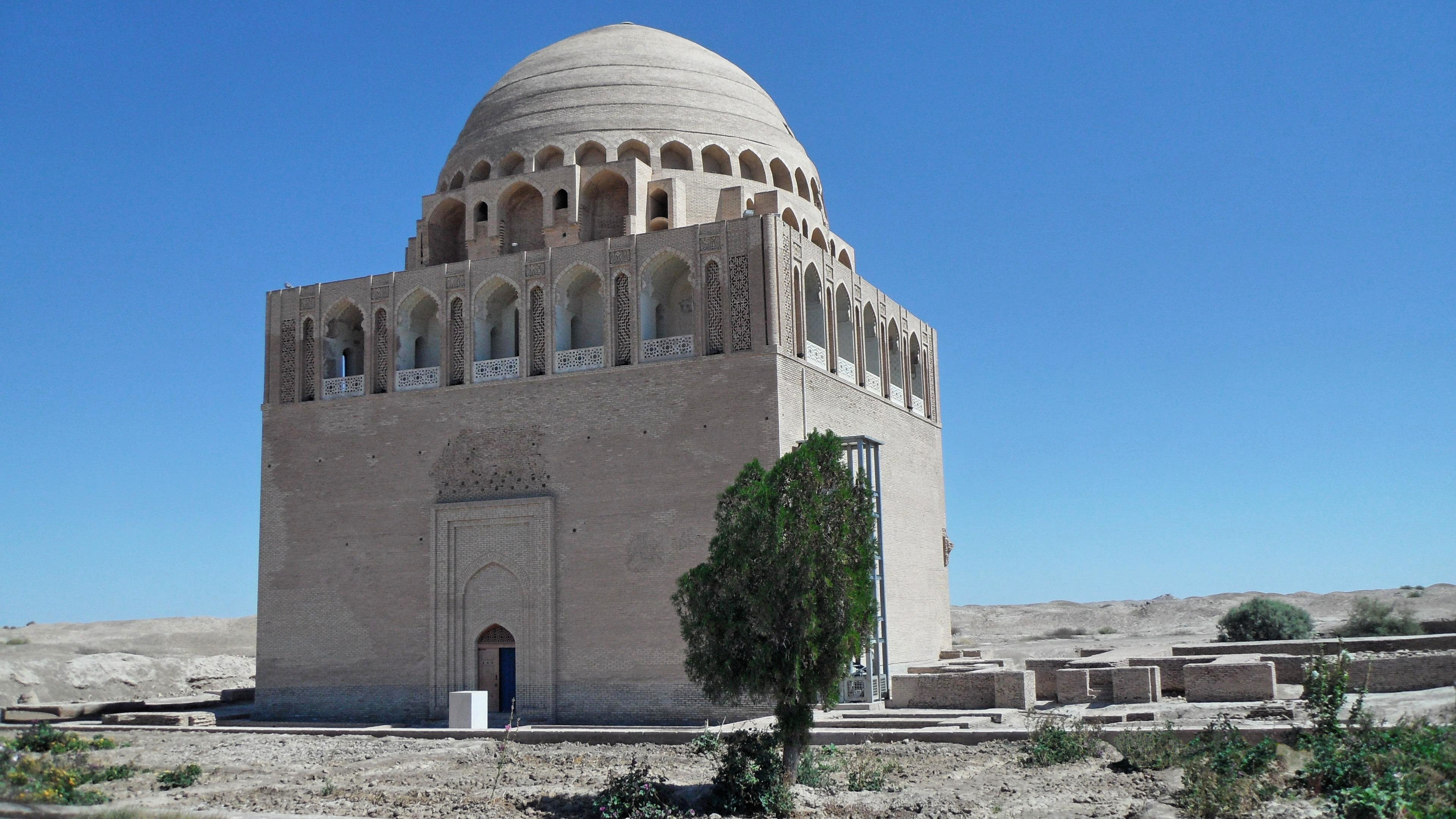

Religion
- Affiliation: Islam
- Year consecrated: 1157
- Status: Restored

Location
- Location: Merv, Turkmenistan
- Interactive map of Tomb of Ahmad Sanjar

Architecture
- Architect: Muhammad ibn Aziz of Sarakhs

Specifications
- Width: 17 m (56 ft)
- Height (max): 27 m

The Tomb of Ahmad Sanjar is a mausoleum commemorating Ahmad Sanjar, a Seljuk ruler of Khorasan. It was built in 1157 in the medieval city of Merv in the Karakum Desert in Turkmenistan. Throughout his reign, Sanjar fought off several invasions and uprisings until finally being defeated by the Oghuz. After being sacked by the Oghuz, Merv declined and in 1221, the Mongols attacked it and burned down the mausoleum. It would later be restored by Soviet, Turkmen, and Turkish architects during the 20th and 21st centuries. The tomb is part of The State Historical and Cultural Park "Ancient Merv", a UNESCO World Heritage Site.

The tomb was built by Sanjar’s successor, Muhammad ibn Aziz, along the Silk Road. It is shaped like a cube with a dome on top, which is 27m high. The walls are 14m high, and the entire dome is 17m by 17m wide. Despite its restorations, the Tomb is still missing features such as its second story, the turquoise covered outer dome, and the surrounding buildings in the complex. Albeit in ruins, the tomb is one of the few surviving examples of secular Seljuk funerary architecture. Its squat proportions and hexadecagonal surrounding of the outer dome would influence later works of architecture.

== Ahmad Sanjar and his Reign ==
The Seljuk ruler Abu’l-Harith Ahmad Sanjar ibn Malik-Shah, or Ahmad Sanjar, (b. 1085 – d. 1157) had a reign that lasted 40 years, and he ruled over eastern Persia at Merv (now in modern Turkmenistan). After wars of succession, Sanjar ascended to the throne at the age of 10 or 12, nominated and appointed by his half-brother Berk-Yaruq. Early in his reign, he defeated several uprisings and invasions such as those of the Ghaznavids in 1097 and Türkmen in 1098. However, he faced his first defeat at Qatwān in 1141 against the Qara Khitai, also known as the Western Liao Empire.

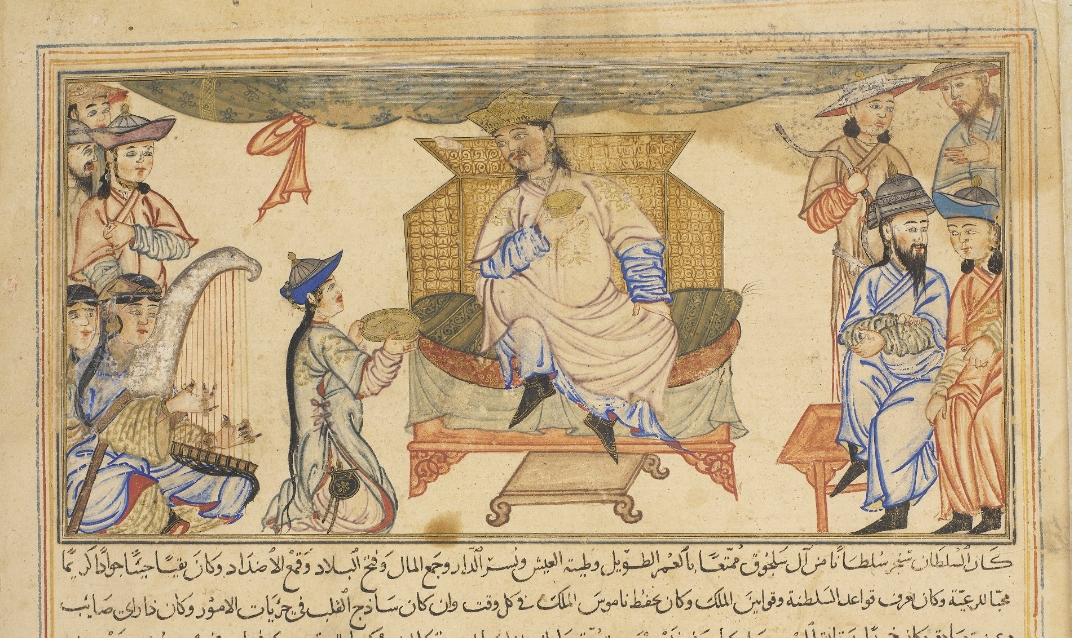
The Coronation of Ahmad Sanjar. Illumination from the "Compendium of Chronicles" by Rashid al-Din, published in Tabriz, Persia in 1307.

However, for the rest of his reign over the next twelve years, Sanjar continued to put down conflicts from his rivals such as the governor of Khwarazm in 1141 and the vassal ruler of the province of Ghūr in 1152. Some historians suggest that these men made the mistake of thinking he was weakened by the Qatwān defeat. Medieval sources depict his rule as one of prosperity. In 1153, Sanjar was captured by the Oghuz and escaped in 1156. During his captivity, the Türkmen raided and looted the province. Merv never recovered from this attack. The Oghuz targeted the ulema’s buildings and even killed many of the scholars, greatly harming the intellectual and religious elite. This plunder made it too difficult for Sanjar to rebuild his society.

== Mongol Invasions ==
In 1221, Mongols led by Tolui attacked Merv, which surrendered after a seven-day siege. Upon the city’s surrender, the Mongols massacred the city’s inhabitants and enslaved around four hundred artisans and a number of children. Arab historian Ali ibn al-Athir states that 700,000 people were killed during the Mongol sack of Merv. The Mongols burned most of the city’s buildings, including the Tomb of Ahmad Sanjar. According to ibn al-Athir, the Mongols “set fire to the city and burned down the mausoleum of Sultan Sanjar, having dug up his grave in the search of precious objects.”' The fire caused significant damage to the structure, destroying much of the mausoleum’s exterior brickwork and causing the building’s outer dome to collapse. Merv remained severely depopulated in the period following the Mongol invasion and the tomb deteriorated further due to centuries of neglect.

== Later History ==
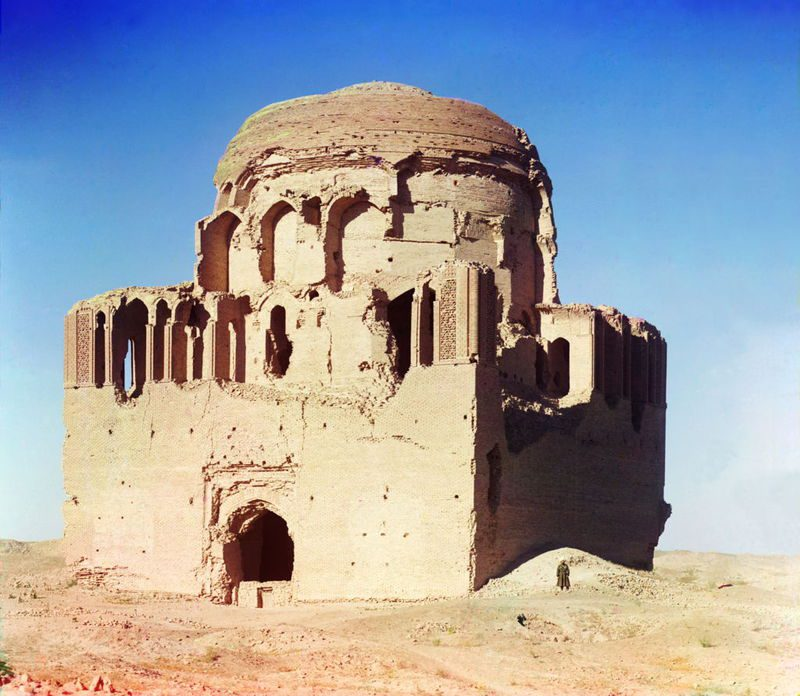
1911 photo of the tomb by Sergey Prokudin-Gorsky, before it was restored.

A report made in 1879-81 describes the tomb as standing in the center of a chahar bagh, surrounded by small tombs and graves. The first photographs of the mausoleum were taken by V.A. Zhukovsky in 1896 and E. Cohn Wiener in 1926. These photographs show the structure's collapsed dome and highly damaged galleries. Soviet architect N.M. Bachinskii completed the first structural analysis of the building during a 1937 restoration. This restoration project also unearthed the foundations of a large mosque adjoining the tomb. Further restoration work was undertaken by the Soviet government during the 1950s.

During the 1980s and 1990s, extensive changes were made to the tomb’s western door and entrance area. The door was surrounded with new bricks, steps leading up to the entrance area were built, and a paved and walled forecourt was constructed. The restoration completed in the late 1980s has been criticized, as it removed or covered over much of the mausoleum’s original brickwork in favor of conjectural reconstruction. In 1996, a cement capping was added to the mausoleum’s dome. Excavations conducted in 1996 also uncovered a bazaar and caravanserai adjacent to the tomb. In 1999, UNESCO declared the monuments of ancient Merv, including the Tomb of Ahmad Sanjar, a UNESCO World Heritage Site. From April 2002 to May 2004, extensive repairs were carried out with the assistance of the Turkish government. The Turkish funded project was reviewed and approved by UNESCO and strived to be faithful to the structure’s original design.

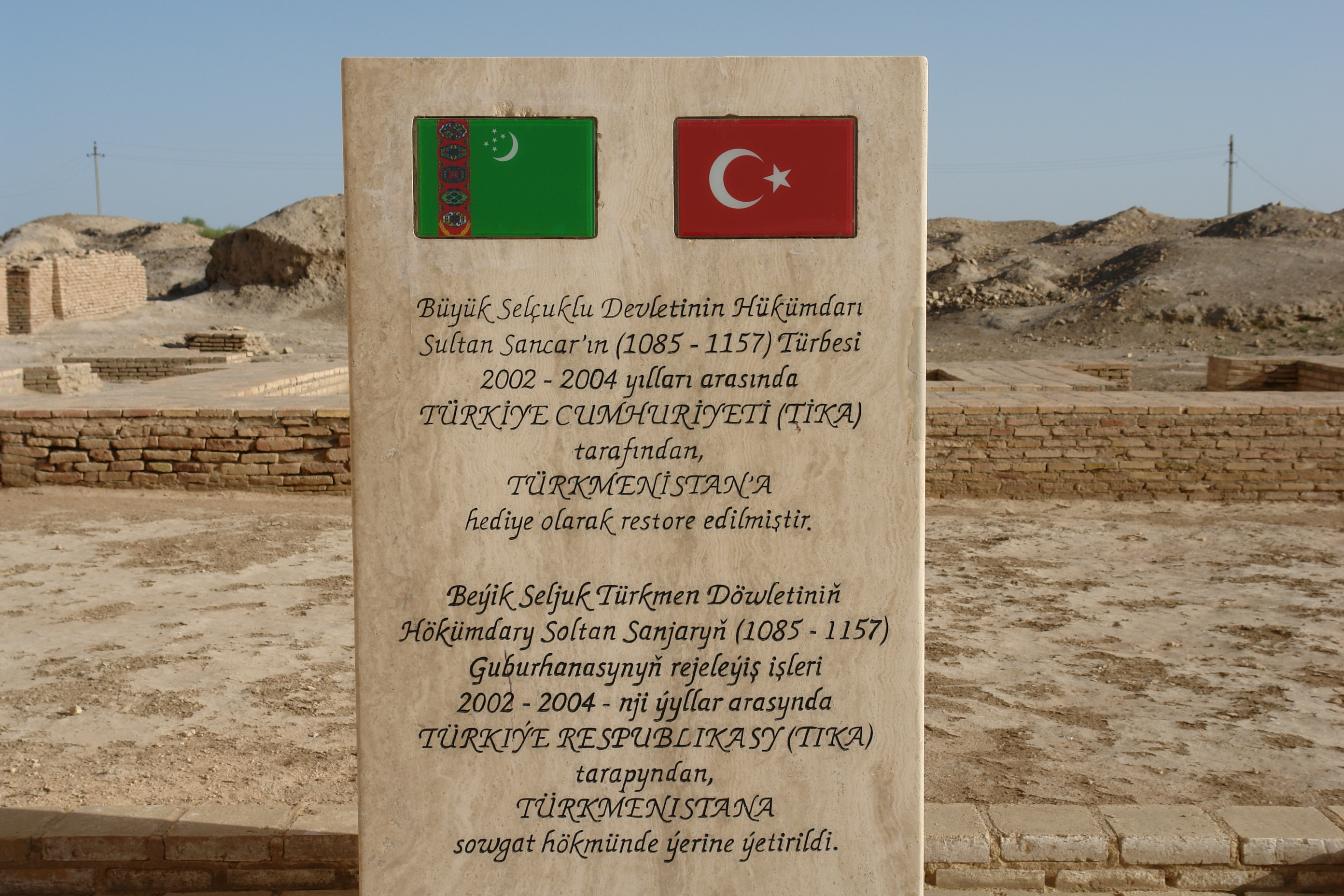
A marble stand commemorating that Sultan Sanjar's Mausoleum was renovated by Turkish government from 2002-2004 as a gift to the Turkmen people.

== Architecture ==
The mausoleum stood 27m high and was 17m by 17m wide. The walls were 14m high and had no major decorations. It was formerly one of the grandest Seljuk tombs, with an ambitious gallery and a double dome, the inner dome consisting of blue glazed bricks with the drum being buttressed at four points. Sanjar's mausoleum was part of a larger complex consisting of a mosque and palace, and was centered in a vast courtyard.

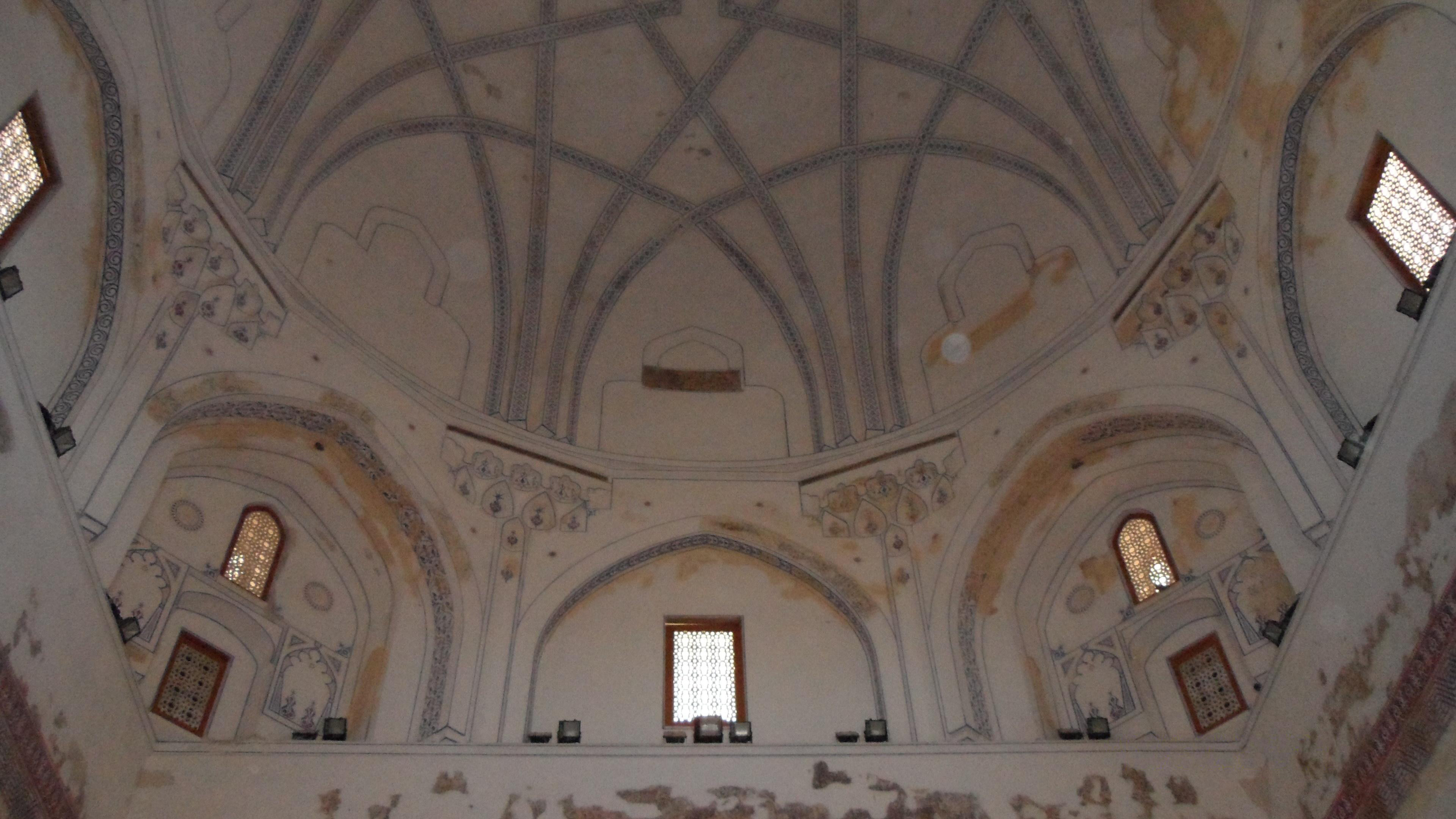
Interior of the mausoleum's dome

Standing alone in the ruins of the city of Merv, Turkmenistan, at the edge of the Karakum Desert, the building sits much lower than most other domed structures built at the time. This was the second project to be sponsored by the Sultan, having previously commissioned a massive dam to be built on the Murghab river. The structure was built on the Silk Road, and it was built by Muhammad ibn Aziz. The tomb was originally connected to a larger compound of buildings, including a mosque, a palace, and other supporting buildings.

Composed of a squat cube topped by a large round dome, the upper story is surrounded by turrets which have deteriorated over time. The interior is much more of a focal point than the exterior. The building is composed of several different building materials, including terracotta, plaster, stucco, and brick. The building has been restored several times, but has lost much of its original structural integrity, especially that of the second story floor. Among the missing features are a formerly turquoise tile covered dome which could be seen from miles away in its prime.

== Influence ==
The majority of secular funerary architecture did not survive the Seljuk period, however, the tomb of Ahmad Sanjar remained intact and went on to influence future domed building. The doubled-domed Seljuk style of the Tomb of Ahmad Sanjar proved a lasting influence on the domed architecture of the Ilkhanid, Timurid and Safavid periods that followed. The Tomb of Ahmad Sanjar deviated from traditional Seljuk funerary towers of its day by moving “towards squatter proportions with a new emphasis on interior space.” This influence that realized later building guided by monumentalizing interior spaces is evidenced by later buildings such as the octagonal-square Dome of Soltaniyeh. The tomb is the first example of a mosque-mausoleum amalgam known to history and this architectural combination would go on to become widespread in the tradition of Islamic buildings and complexes. The influence of Ahmad Sanjar’s mausoleum is evidenced by multiple architectural additions at the Jameh Mosque of Isfahan, including two of its domes. The architect of the Jameh Mosque of Isfahan’s north-eastern squared-dome “utilized these standard forms to create a work of art” while the southern dome mimicked the Tomb of Ahmad Sanjar’s use of a hexadecagon that surrounds the outer dome. Similarly, internal stiffener implements applied at the Sultaniyya Mausoleum in Cairo demonstrate the influence of Seljuk building techniques. When the Ilkhanid ruler Ghāzān Khān visited Merv and witnessed the Tomb of Ahmad Sanjar he was so awe-struck that he sought to both cite and outdo Ahmad Sanjar’s tomb with the building of his own funerary complex at Shamb. Other Islamic funerary architecture that derived influence from the Seljuk style of the Tomb of Ahmad Sanjar include examples such as the Sultan Bakht Aqa mausoleum, the Mir-chaqmaq mosque and the Sultani madrasa.

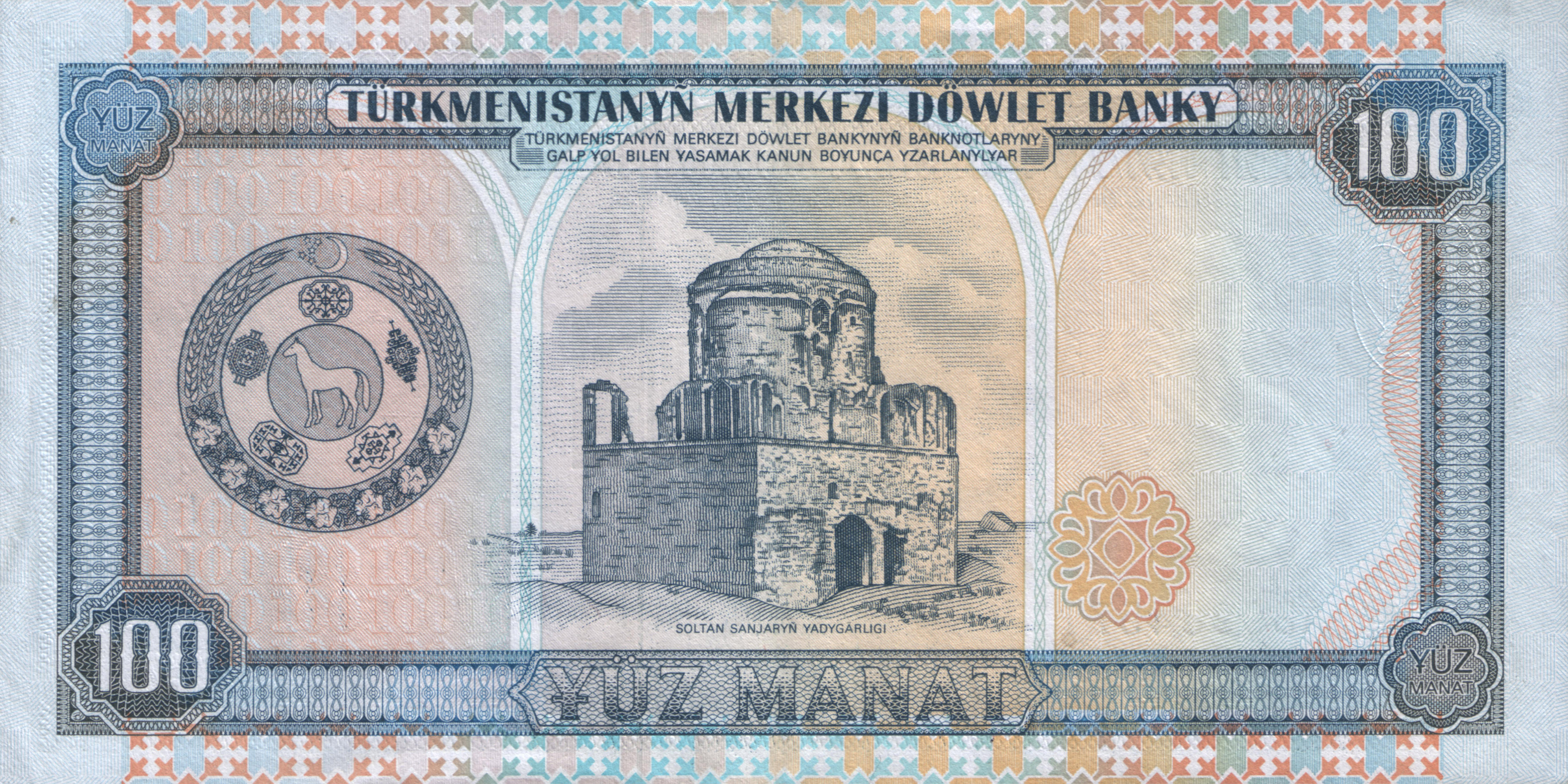
Tomb of Ahmed Sanjar on the 100 manat banknote.

== See also ==
- Great Seljuk architecture
- Persian domes

== Sources ==
- Ashkan, Maryam and Ahmad, Yahaya. "Significance of Conical and Polyhedral Domes in Persia and Surrounding Areas: Morphology, Typologies, and Geometric Characteristics." Nexus Network Journal 14, no. 2, (2012): 275-289. https://doi.org/10.26687
- Bayne Fisher, William, et al. The Cambridge History of Iran, Volume 5: The Saljuq and Mongol Periods. Cambridge: Cambridge University Press, 1968. ISBN 978-0521069366.
- Blessing, Patricia. “Architecture, Scale, and Empire: Monuments in Anatolia between Mamluk and Ilkhanid Aspirations,” Вопросы всеобщей истории архитектуры [Questions of the History of World Architecture, Moscow] 11, no. 2. (December 2018): http://dx.doi.org/10.25995/NIITIAG.2019.11.2.007
- Boyle, John. “The Mongol Invasion of Eastern Persia, 1220-1223.” History today, 13, no. 9 (September 1963): 614-623. ISSN 0018-2753
- Creswell, K. A. C. (1913). "The Origin of the Persian Double Dome". The Burlington Magazine for Connoisseurs. 24: 94. https://www.jstor.org/stable/859524
- Ettinghausen, Richard; Grabar, Oleg; Jenkins, Marilyn. Islamic Art and Architecture 650-1250. New Haven: Yale University Press, 2001.
- Gye, David; Hillenbrand, Robert. “Mausolea at Merv and Dehistan.” Iran : Journal of the British Institute of Persian Studies. 39 (January 2001): 53–54. https://www.jstor.org/stable/4300597
- Hillenbrand, Robert. Islamic Architecture. Edinburgh: Edinburgh University Press, 1999. ISBN 978-0748613793
- Ibn Al-Athir Ali. The Chronicle of Ibn Al-Athir for the Crusading Period from Al-Kamil Fi’l-Ta’rikh. Part 3: The Years 589-629/1193-1231: The Ayyubids After Saladin and the Mongol Menace. trans. by D. S. Richards, 2010, p. 226.
- Knobloch, Edgar. Monuments of Central Asia. New York: I.B. Tauris, 2001.
- Michell, George. Architecture of the Islamic World. London: Thames and Hudson Ltd., 1995. ISBN 978-0500278475
- Ruggles, D. Fairchild. Islamic Gardens and Landscapes. Philadelphia: University of Pennsylvania Press, 2008. ISBN 978-0812240252.
- Saunders, John Joseph. The History of the Mongol Conquests. Philadelphia: University of Pennsylvania Press, 1971. ISBN 978-0812217667
- Selcuklu Municipality, “Tomb of Sultan Sanjar,” accessed December 8, 2020, http://www.selcuklumirasi.com/architecture-detail/tomb-of-sultan-sanjar
- “Sultan Sancar Tomb Restoration - Marv / Turkmenistan,” May 26, 2020. Accessed December 8, 2020. https://www.gentes.com.tr/en/projeler/sultan-sancar-tomb-restoration-marv-turkmenistan/
- “Sultan Sanjar Mausoleum, Merv, Turkmenistan.” Asian Architecture. Accessed December 8, 2020. https://www.orientalarchitecture.com/sid/1320/turkmenistan/merv/sultan-sanjar-mausoleum
- Tor, D. G. “The Eclipse of Khurāsān in the twelfth century.” Bulletin of SOAS, 81, 2 (2018), 251-276. http://dx.doi.org/10.1017/S0041977X18000484
- UNESCO Office Tashkent, and Georgina Herrmann. The Archaeological Park 'Ancient Merv' Turkmenistan, UNESCO, 1998.https://whc.unesco.org/uploads/nominations/886.pdf
