= Jalal al-Din Mangburni =

Last shah of the Khwarazmian Empire from 1220 to 1231

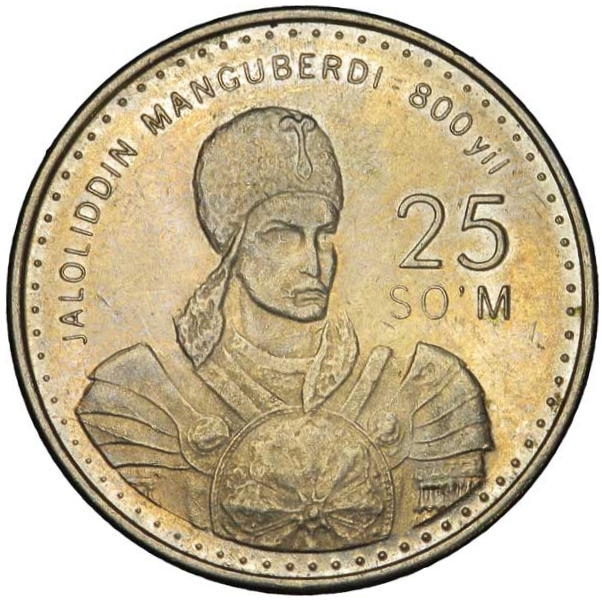
- Uzbek 25 soʻm coin commemorating Jalal al-Din

Khwarazmshah
- Reign: December 1220 – 15 August 1231
- Predecessor: Muhammad II
- Born: 1199; Gurganj
- Died: 15 August 1231 (aged 31–32); Silvan, Diyarbakır
- Spouse: Qutlubika Khatun; Sulafa Khatun; Tamta Mkhargrdzeli
- Dynasty: Anushtegin
- Father: Muhammad II
- Mother: Ay Chichak Khatun
- Religion: Sunni Islam

Jalal al-Din Mangburni (Persian: جلال الدین مِنکُبِرنی), also known as Jalal al-Din Khwarazmshah (جلال الدین خوارزمشاه), was the last Khwarazmshah of the Anushtegin dynasty. The eldest son and successor of Ala ad-Din Muhammad II of the Khwarazmian Empire, Jalal al-Din was brought up at Gurganj, the wealthy capital of the Khwarazmid homeland. An able general, he served as second-in-command to his father in at least one battle; however, since he was the son of a concubine, he was challenged as successor by a younger brother, whose cause was supported by the powerful Queen Mother, Terken Khatun. Nevertheless, after the Mongol conquest of the Khwarazmian Empire led to his father's flight and death on an island in the Caspian Sea, Jalal-al Din gained the loyalty of the majority of Khwarazmian loyalists.

The new Shah Jalal al-Din moved to Gurganj, but departed eastwards after Terken Khatun moved against him; evading Mongol patrols, he gathered a substantial army at Ghazni. He managed to inflict an excellent defeat on Shigi Qutuqu at the Battle of Parwan, but soon lost a good portion of his army in a dispute over spoils. He was defeated by a vengeful Genghis Khan at the Battle of the Indus, and fled across the river. Now essentially a warlord, Jalal al-Din managed to establish a succession of short-lived states: first in the Punjab from 1222 to 1224, and then in northwest Iran and Georgia after 1225. Jalal al-Din did not have the political ability needed to underpin his martial exploits, and he was forced to combat several large revolts and increasing pressure from Mongol forces. Eventually, he was killed in 15 August 1231. The army he had gathered would continue to terrorize the Levant as the mercenary Khwarazmiyya until its final defeat in 1246.

== Name and early life ==
The spelling and meaning of his Turkic personal name is obscure. In al-Nasawi's work (written in Arabic) his name was written as "Jalal al-Din Mankubirti (Note: Or Mankibirti, Mankubarti, Mankibarti, Mankuburti etc.), son of the Sultan Muhammad, son of Tekish, son of Il-Arslan, son of Atsiz, son of Muhammad, son of Nushtekin" (Arabic: جلال الدين منكبرتي ابن السلطان محمد بن تكش ابن ایل ارسلان بن اتسز ابن محمد ابن نوشتكين, romanized: Jalāl al-Dīn Mankubirtī ibn al-Sulṭān Muḥammad bin Tekiš ibn ʾIl Ārslān bin Ātsiz ibn Muḥammad ibn Nūštekīn). Original publisher of the manuscript, Octave Houdas, rendered his name (in French title) as "Mankobirti" and translated it as "Dieu donné" (Gift of God). Due to Arabic rendering, early scholarship spelled it as Manguburti (or similar variants), whilst the most common variant today is Mangburni ("with a birthmark on the nose") or Mingirini ("valiant fighter worth one thousand men"; cf. Persian hazarmard).

Jalal al-Din was reportedly the eldest son of the Khwarazmshah Ala ad-Din Muhammad II (r. 1200–1220), while his mother was a concubine of Turkmen origin, whose name was Ay-Chichek. Due to the low status of Jalal al-Din's mother, his powerful grandmother and Kipchak princess Terken Khatun refused to support him as heir to the throne, and instead favored his half-brother Uzlagh-Shah, whose mother was also a Qipchaq. Jalal al-Din first appears in historical records in 1215, when Muhammad II divided his empire among his sons, giving the southwestern part (part of the former Ghurid Empire) to Jalal al-Din.

== Mongol campaigns ==
=== Mongol invasion and accession ===
Genghis Khan had chosen to ignore a skirmish between his son Jochi Khan and the Shah, in which Jalal al-Din's military acumen had saved the Shah from a humiliating defeat. However, he could not ignore the seizure of a trade caravan in Otrar and subsequent execution of Mongol envoys in Gurganj. War between the two new neighbours was inevitable. The Khan commanded a skilled and disciplined army: the precise size of it is disputed, but most agree on around 75,000 to 200,000 soldiers. The Khwarazmshah, meanwhile, faced many problems. (Note: As with the Mongol army, there is also debate as to the size and composition of the Shah's forces. Juvaini states that 50,000 were sent to aid Otrar, and gives a total of around 400,000. Most modern historians, however, prefer figures of between 50,000 and 150,000 effective soldiers.) His empire was vast and newly formed, with a still-developing administration. In addition, his mother Terken Khatun still wielded substantial power in the realm – one historian termed the relationship between the Shah and his mother as 'an uneasy diarchy', which often acted to Muhammad's disadvantage. The Shah also distrusted most of his commanders, with the only exception being Jalal al-Din. If he had sought open battle, as many of his commanders wished, he would certainly have been greatly outmatched in quantity of troops, let alone quality. The Shah thus made the decision to distribute his forces as garrison troops inside his most important towns, such as Samarkand, Merv and Nishapur. Meanwhile, the Shah raised taxes to raise a field army, with whom he would harass the besieging Mongol forces.

However, through a combination of excellent manoeuvering and planning, the Mongols managed to carve a path of destruction through Khwarazmia. Otrar fell, and Bukhara was taken, as was Samarkand. Genghis Khan then sent an army under his elite generals Jebe and Subutai specifically to pursue the Shah; although Muhammad, accompanied by Jalal-al Din and two other sons, managed to escape, he was prevented from gathering any forces as his empire collapsed around him. Fleeing to the loyal region of Khorasan, the Shah died destitute on an island in the Caspian Sea. Jalal al-Din would later claim that his father had appointed him as his successor on his deathbed. Meanwhile, the Mongols had occupied all of Transoxania, and had invaded Tocharistan, Guzgan and Gharchistan during the latter half of 1220.

Jalal al-Din rode to Gurganj, a city reportedly housing 90,000 soldiers, and found the city in turmoil. The city's nobility, like Terken Khatun, were not prepared to accept Jalal al-Din as Shah, preferring the more malleable Uzlaq, and planned a coup against Jalal al-Din.Jalal Al-Din left the capital after being warned of the coup, accompanied by Timur Malik and 300 cavalry. Crossing the Karakum Desert, he attacked the garrison of a Mongol detachment at Nesa, killing most of the force including two brothers of Toghachar, son in law of Genghis Khan. The Mongols pursued, past Nishapur and Herat, but lost the trail before Ghazni, where Jalal al-Din found 50,000 loyalists waiting for him. After a few days, he was joined by his maternal uncle Temur Malik, who brought an additional 30,000 veterans – Jalal al-Din now had a sizeable force with which to strike back at the Mongols. Meanwhile, back in Khwarazm, Gurganj, Merv, Balkh, and Nishapur had all been taken by the Mongol forces.

=== Battles at Parwan and the Indus ===
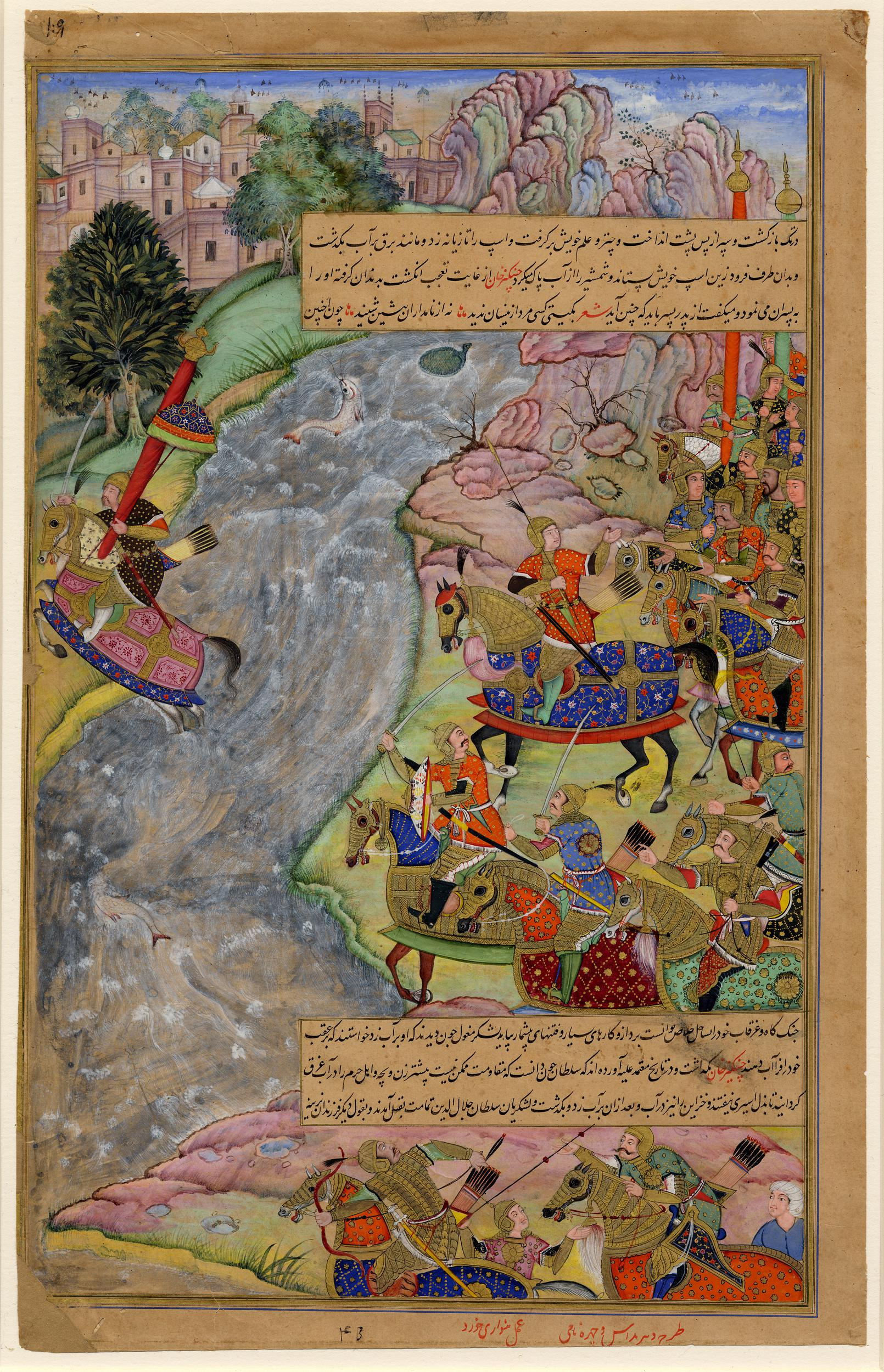
Battle of the Indus: Jalal al-Din Khwarazm-Shah crossing the rapid Indus River on horseback, escaping Genghis Khan and the Mongol army.

Jalal al-Din, who had just married Temur Malik's daughter to solidify ties, marched towards Kandahar which was under siege by a Mongol army and defeated them after a two-day battle. In autumn 1221, he then moved north to Parwan and attacked a besieging army north of Charikar in the Battle of Waliyan; the numerically inferior Mongols lost 1,000 and retreated across the river, destroying the bridge. Genghis sent an army numbering between thirty and forty-five thousand under Shigi Qutuqu to confront the Shah. The Battle of Parwan was fought on a rock-strewn, narrow valley which was unsuitable for the Mongol cavalry, and the Muslims fought dismounted until the final charge led by Jalal al-Din, who personally commanded the center, resulting in the repulsion of the Mongols. This battle made Jalal al-Din's reputation; however, he soon lost half of his army through infighting: the sources report a dispute over booty between Temur Malik and Ighrak, commander of the right flank.

Jalal al-Din had won several victories against the Mongols in 1221, and after the Battle of Parwan, independent insurgency groups emerged in multiple cities inspired by his deeds. Kushteghin Pahlawan launched a revolt in Merv and ousted the Mongol administration; he then made a successful attack on Bukhara, while Herat also rebelled. These revolts would be crushed by the Mongols, and many atrocities perpetuated as retribution.

Genghis Khan, now at Bamiyan, did not take this defeat lightly. After executing that fortress, he made his way eastwards to confront Jalal al-Din, using his powers of organisation to send detachments out to prevent the disparate Khwarazmid factions from uniting, one of whom al-Din managed to isolate and defeat. Jalal Al-Din knew he had no chance of winning against Genghis in a pitched battle with his diminished army and after attempts to win back Ighrak and his men failed, he marched towards India. The Khan's army managed to surround Jalal al-Din's army on the banks of the River Indus and crushed them in the ensuing battle in November 1221. The Shah escaped the battle by jumping into the river fully armed, and reaching the other shore. This act of desperation is said to have drawn the admiration of Genghis Khan, who forbade Mongols to pursue the Shah or shoot him with arrows. The Shah's surviving troops were however slaughtered, along with his harem and children.

== Later campaigns ==
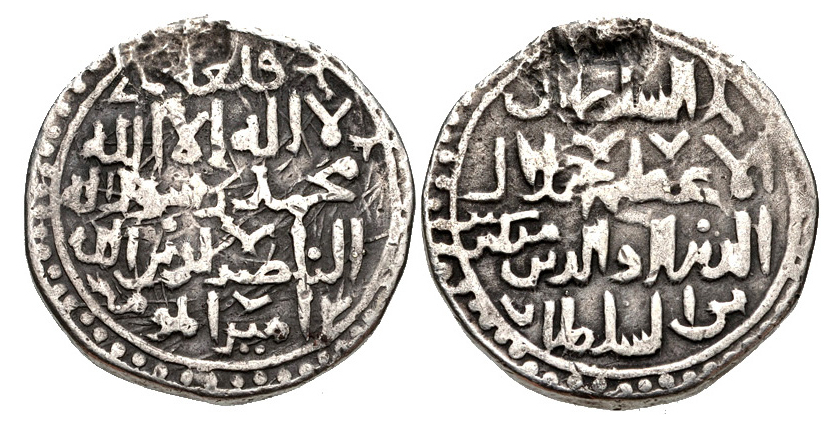
Silver coin (AR Double Dirham) of Jalal al-Din Mangubarni, issued from Qara Nay mint.

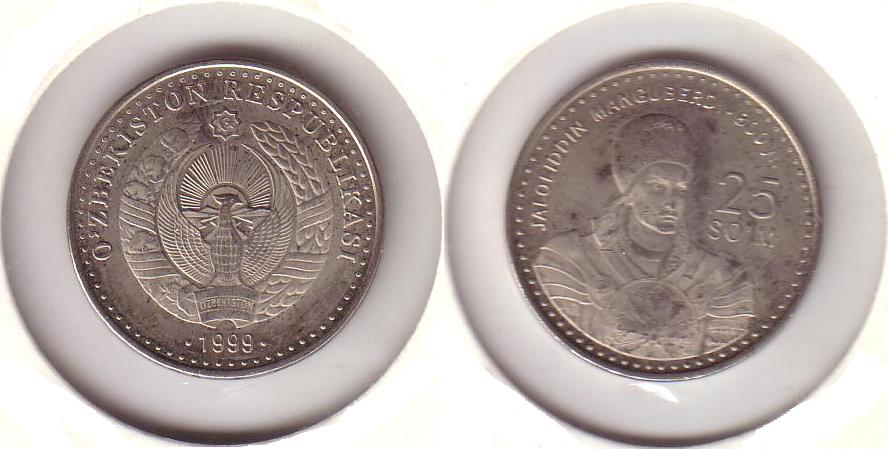
Commemorative coin of Jalal al-Din Mangubarni in Gurganj

=== Indian subcontinent ===
After the Battle of the Indus, Jalal al-Din crossed the Indus and settled in India. A local prince, who had six thousand men attacked Jalal al-Din's makeshift forces of no more than four thousand, but al-Din still triumphed, greatly enhancing his Indian appeal. He then sought asylum in the Sultanate of Delhi but Iltutmish denied this to him because of al-Din's poor relationship with the Abbasid caliphs; he did however give one of his daughters to al-Din as a peace offering. The Khan sent Dorbei Doqshin with two tumens to pursue al-Din, whom he still regarded as a threat, in early 1222; one account has Doqshin fail to secure al-Din, and return to the Khan in Samarkand, who was so infuriated Doqshin was sent out at once on the same task. Meanwhile, al-Din was quarrelling with local princes, but was mostly victorious when it came to battle.

Under Doqshin's leadership, the Mongol army took Nandana fort of Janjua tribe from one of the lieutenants of Jalal al-Din, sacked it, then proceeded to besiege the larger Multan. The Mongol army managed to breach the wall but the city was defended successfully by the Khwarazmians; due to the hot weather, the Mongols were forced to retreat after 42 days. Peter Jackson suggests that Doqshin, having been instructed not to return unsuccessfully, eventually converted to Islam and joined al-Din. The rest of al-Din's three years in exile in India were spent in taking large parts of Lahore and the Punjab; he returned to Persia at the behest of his brother Ghiyath al-Din Pirshah, who still controlled parts of Persia, in late 1223.

=== Persia and Georgia ===
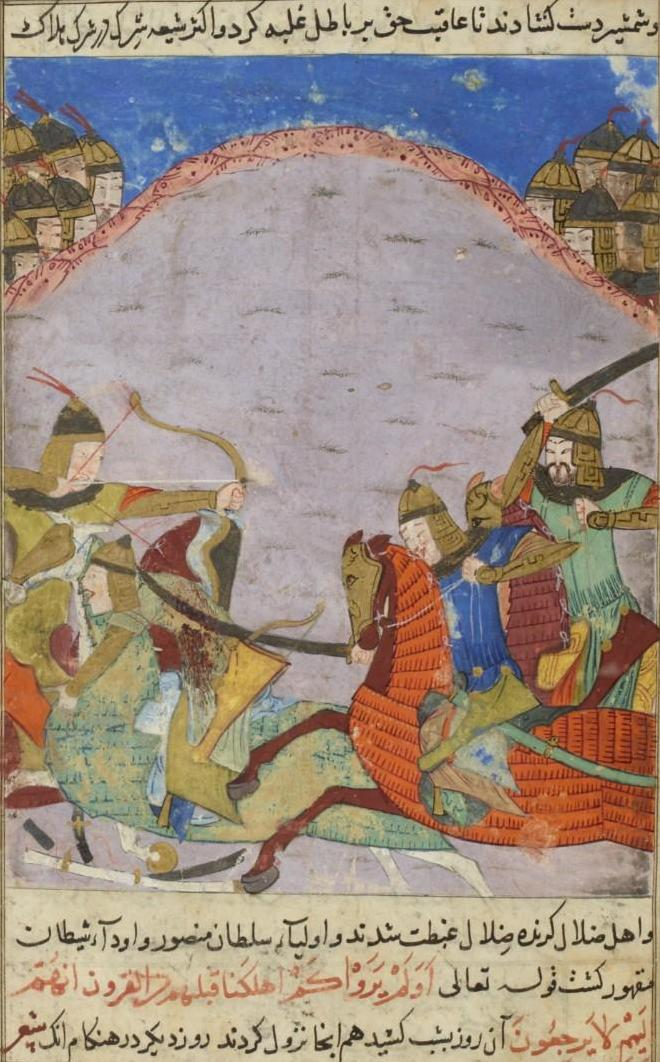
The Georgians (left) against the Khwarazmians (right) in the Battle of Bolnisi in 1227. From the Tarikh-i Jahangushay manuscript created in Shiraz, Iran, in 1438.

Having gathered an army and entered Persia, Jalal al-Din sought to re-establish the Khwarazm kingdom, but he never fully consolidated his power. In 1224, he confirmed Burak Hadjib, ruler of the Qara Khitai, in Kerman, and received the submission of his brother Ghiyath, who had established himself in Hamadan and Isfahan, and the province of Fars, and clashed with the Caliph An Nasser in Khuzestan, from whom he captured parts of Western Iran. The next year, he dethroned Muzaffar al-Din Özbeg, ruler of the Eldiguzids, and set himself up in their capital of Tabriz on 25 July 1225. That same year, he attacked Georgia, defeating its forces in the battle of Garni, and captured Tbilisi, after which a hundred thousand citizens were put to death for not renouncing Christianity.

Jalal al-Din spent the rest of his days struggling against the Mongols, pretenders to the throne and the Seljuqs of Rûm. His dominance in the region required year-after-year campaigning. In 1226, Burak Hadjib, the governor of Kerman and Jalal al-Din's father-in-law, rebelled against him, but after Jalal al-Din marched against him he was subdued. Jalal al-Din then had a brief victory over the Seljuqs and captured the town of Akhlat on the northwestern shore of Lake Van from the Kurdish Ayyubids. In 1227, after the death of Genghis Khan, a new Mongol army commanded by Chormagan was sent to invade Jalal al-Din's lands; they were met near Dameghan and defeated. In August 1228, a new Mongol army under the leadership of Taymas Noyan invaded the re-established kingdom. Jalal al-Din met them near Isfahan and the two armies fought. The Mongols scored a pyrrhic victory in this battle, unable to exploit their victory as they had no power left to advance. The same year, his brother Ghiyath al-Din rebelled but was defeated. Ghiyath al-Din fled to Kerman where he and his mother were killed. The revived Khwarazmshah by this time controlled Kerman, Tabriz, Isfahan and Fars. Jalal al-Din moved against Ahlat again in 1229 which prompted the Ayyubids to establish an alliance with the Seljuqs causing Jalal al-Din to begin a military campaign against the Seljuq-Ayyubid forces. However, he was defeated in this campaign by Seljuq Sultan Kayqubad I at the Battle of Yassıçemen in 1230, from whence he escaped to Diyarbakır.

=== Death ===
Through the ruler of Alamut, the Mongols learned that Jalal al-Din had recently been defeated; the Nizari Ismaili Assassins sent a letter to Ögedei Khan, proposing joint operation against Jalal al-Din. Ögedei Khan sent a new army of 30,000 – 50,000 men under the command of Chormagan and the remaining Khwarazmians, whose numbers were in hundreds, were swept away by the new Mongol army, which occupied Northern Iran. Jalal al-Din once again escaped from the Mongols and took refuge in the Silvan mountains. In August he was killed by a Kurd who claimed that he was avenging his brother, who had been killed by Jalal al-Din's forces in Ahlat.

Jalal al-Din's kingdom swiftly collapsed after his death; his nobles squabbled over territory and would be overcome easily by the Mongols. Several thousand, however, took up service with the princes of Anatolia and Syria to escape the Mongols. They continued to be a force in Syrian politics until their destruction in 1246. His daughter, Turkan, would grow up in the court of Ögedei Khan and then Hulagu Khan, who married her to the governor of Mosul, Al-Salih Isma'il ibn Lu'lu'.

Some pretenders to the name of Jalal al-Din arose after his death. In 1236, the founder and the leader of an insurgency in Mazandaran claimed he was Jalal al-Din. After he was defeated, the Mongols verified that his claim was false, and he was executed. In the year 1254, a leader of a merchant group claimed he was Jalal al-Din; detained and tortured, he asserted he was truthful until his death.

== Legacy and assessment ==
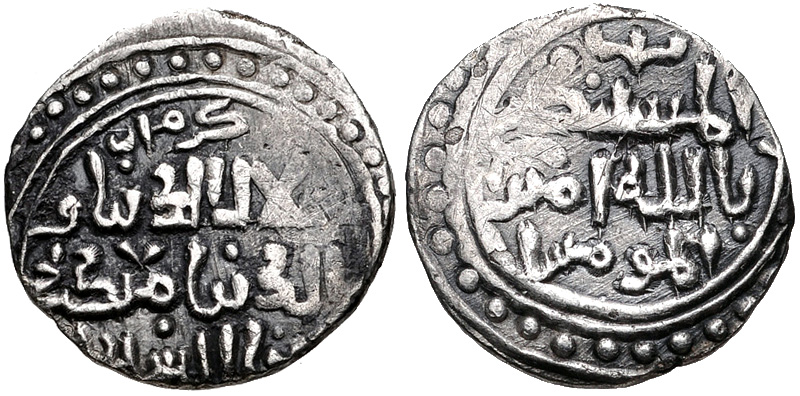
Dirham of Jalal al-Din, citing Abbasid caliph Al-Mustansir Bi'llah 623–628 AH (1226–1231 AD).

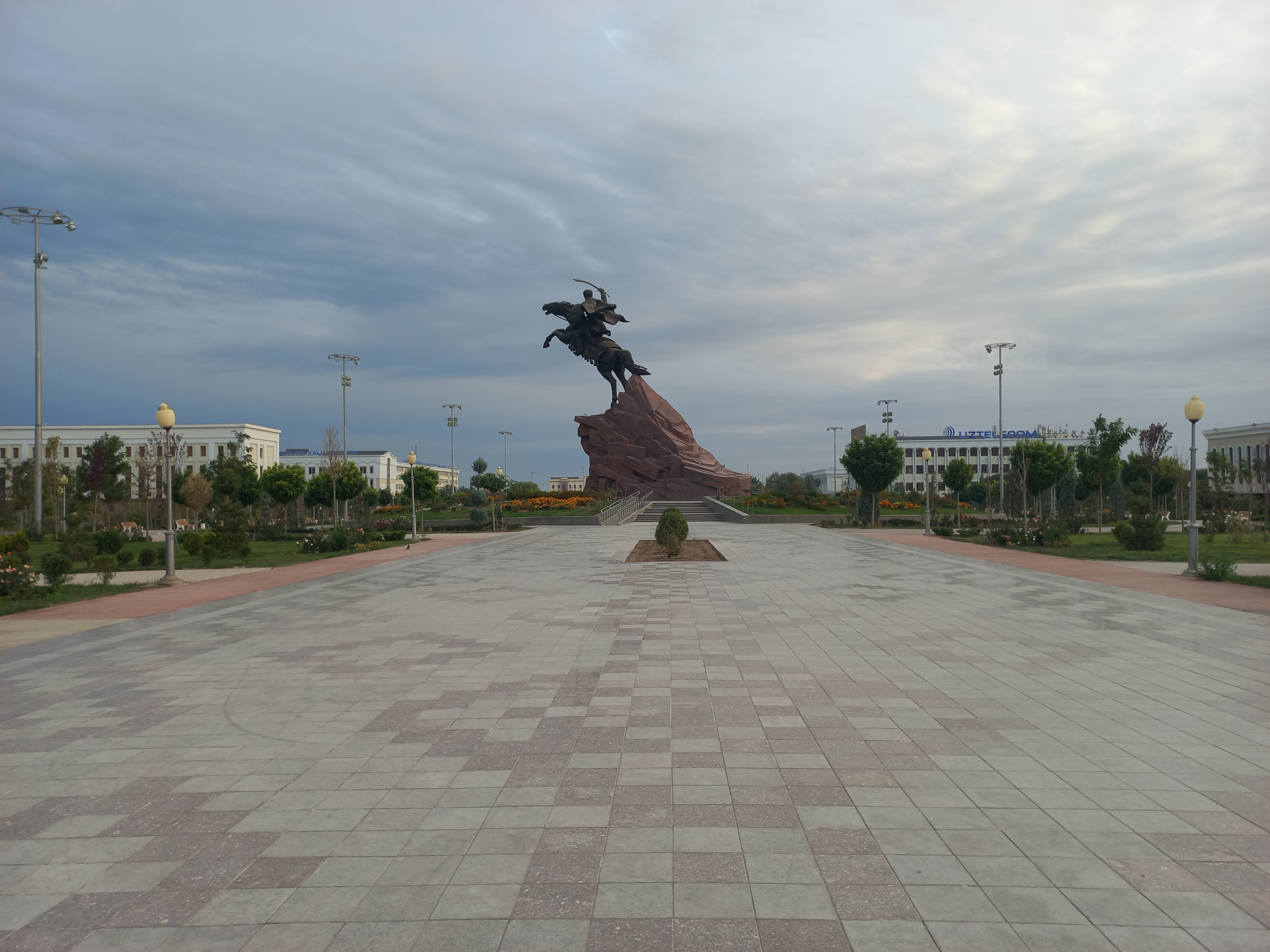
Equestrian statue of Jalal al-Din in Urgench

Jalal al-Din was considered by many to be a fearless commander and a great warrior. His biographer, Shihab al-Din Muhammad al-Nasawi, described him as follows:

He was swarthy (dark-skinned), small in stature, Turkic in "behavior" and speech, but he also spoke Persian. As for his courage, I have mentioned it many times when describing the battles he took part in. He was a lion among lions and the most fearless among his valiant horsemen. He was mild in his temper though, did not get easily provoked and never used bad language.

Juzjani described al-Din as "endowed with great heroism, valour and high talents and accomplishments". Yaqut al-Hamawi notes that Jalal al-Din was known as a bellicose warrior and Jalal al-Din's passiveness after the Battle of Yassıçemen was seen as unbelievable. Modern historians are also positive concerning his military talent. Carl Sverdrup described Jalal al-Din as "brave and energetic"; while Timothy May describes him as the most stalwart enemy of the Mongols in West Asia until the time of the Mamluk Sultanate. Due to his reputation for resisting the Mongols, Jalal al-Din is commonly depicted on artwork resembling that of the Persian epic Shahnameh, where he is associated with the mythological warrior Rostam. Jalal al-Din's contemporary Ibn Wasil attributed the Mongol triumph over the Muslim countries into Jalal al-Din's fall, which was in turn attributed to Jalal al-Din's treachorus behaviour. Ibn Wasil explicitly stated that Jalal al-Din's army could have been a buffer between the Islamic countries and the Mongols. Even after defeating Jalal al-Din at the battle of Indus, Genghis Khan was keen on maintaining peace with Jalal al-Din, promising not to cross the demarcation between the Mongol empire and Jalal al-Din's re-established realm after being informed of Jalal al-Din's might.

Though considered a successful warrior and a general, Jalal al-Din is considered a poor ruler and the loss of his re-established empire to Mongols has been attributed to his poor diplomacy and rulership; he was seen as untrustworthy and warmongering. His enmity with many neighbors resulted in his isolation against the Mongol army of Chormaqan. Vasily Bartold believed that Jalal al-Din executed more cruel and irrational brutality than Genghis Khan did. Even al-Nasawi was unable to justify the negative impact Jalal al-Din's rule and conduct of his soldiers had on his subjects. Jalal al-Din is represented as a hero valianty fighting for "Persian independence" by the Iranian bureaucrat and historian Ata-Malik Juvayni (died 1283), who, however, was in reality aware that Jalal al-Din was fighting for his own survival and selfish motives.

=== Cultural influence ===
Ottoman patriot Namık Kemal hailed him as a national and religious hero in his work Celâleddin Harzemşâh (Khwarazmshah Jalal al-Din). In Kemâl's work he was fighting against Mongols for the national unity and wellbeing of Oghuz Turks, and against Georgians for the spread of Islam. Influenced by the Cromwell of Hugo, Kemâl wrote a preface to it, commonly called as Mukaddime-i Celâl (Preface to Jalal), and just as what Hugo did with his preface, Kemal too outlined his understanding of a modern play with the preface.

Jalal al-Din was the subject of the Uzbek-Turkish TV series Mendirman Jaloliddin, created by Mehmet Bozdağ in collaboration with the Uzbek Ministry of Culture and Sports, where he was played by Emre Kıvılcım. A sculpture of him by Saragt Babaýew won a national competition in 2015, receiving a prize from the president of Turkmenistan, Gurbanguly Berdimuhamedow.

Preceded by Muhammad II	Sultan of the Khwarazmian Empire; 1220 – 15 August 1231	Succeeded by Mongol conquest
