= Battle of Parwan =

1221 battle between the Khwarazmian Empire and the Mongol Empire

- Part of the Mongol invasion of the Khwarazmian Empire
| Date | September 1221 |
| Location | Parwan, Khwarazmian Empire (present-day Hazarajat, Afghanistan) 35°N 69°E |
| Result | Khwarazmian victory |

Belligerents
| Mongol Empire | Khwarazmian Empire |

Commanders and leaders
| Shigi Qutuqu | Jalal al-Din Mangburni; Saif al-Din Ighraq; Amin Malik |

Strength
| 30,000–70,000; As many as 10,000 cavalry in total | 30,000–120,000; As many as 15,000 in total (mostly infantry) |

Casualties and losses
| Heavy | Moderate-heavy |
- Location of the battle on a map of modern Afghanistan Parwan (South Asia)

The Battle of Parwan was fought between Sultan Jalal al-Din Mangburni of the Khwarazmian Empire and the Mongols ruled by Genghis Khan in September 1221 AD during the Mongol invasion of the Khwarazmian Empire at Parwan, north of Kabul, in present-day Afghanistan. Jalal ad-Din had previously attacked a detachment of Mongols near Wilan (Waliyan), which provoked Genghis Khan into sending an army of 30,000 troops under Shigi Qutuqu. As a result of the tactics adopted by Jalal ad-Din, the Mongol army was destroyed in a two-day battle. As news of the Mongol defeat spread, several cities, including Merv and Herat, which had previously surrendered and accepted Mongol rule, rebelled. In response, Genghis Khan moved to battle Jalal ad-Din, who had lost half of his troops to desertion due to a quarrel over the division of spoils after the battle, and was forced to move to Ghazni to prepare to retreat to India. Genghis Khan intercepted Jalal ad-Din's army as he was preparing to cross the Indus River, and in the ensuing battle he lost his army, treasury and family, but survived to eventually establish a power base in Punjab and Sindh.

== Background ==
Genghis Khan invaded the Khwarazmian Empire to avenge the murder of a Mongol trade caravan by the government of Otrar and the subsequent refusal of Shah Ala ad-Din Muhammad II to bring the governor of Otrar to task for his crime. Genghis Khan commanded a skilled, disciplined, combat-proven army of 150,000 to 200,000 soldiers, mostly Mongols and other allied tribes who were well-drilled in their method of warfare. The army also included a corps of Chinese siege engineers. Genghis Khan was a experienced leader whose sons Jochi, Chagatai, Ogedei and Tolui were competent generals. He was also served by generals like Jebe and Subutai, adept in employing flexible and innovative tactics.

Shah Muhammad II may have been able to mobilize a mercenary army numbering 200,000 to 400,000 men, but his Turkish soldiers were undisciplined, and unity was lacking between the Turks and Ghurs in the army. The mistrust that the Shah had for his Qanqli Turk troops and commanders meant he could only offer battle under favorable conditions with superior numbers. He adopted a defence in depth strategy based on fortified cities, and stationed garrisons of veteran soldiers at various cities including Otrar, Bukhara, Banakat and Samarkand, trusting to the Mongol inexperience with siegecraft and their unfamiliarity with the terrain to delay their progress and give him the chance to offer battle at his own initiative. He planned to raise a new army beyond the Amu Darya near Kelif and then strike the Mongols in Transoxania, or defend the Amu Darya barrier by preventing the Mongols from crossing the river, and if needed retreat to Ghazni and then to India. (Note: Historians agree that the choice of the Khwarazmshah Muhammad II was due to the Battle near the Irghiz River.)

Genghis Khan invested Otrar with his entire field army in September 1219. After some time, he divided his army, sending a detachment under his eldest son Jochi down the Syr Darya, and another division to march on Banakat. Leaving Chagatai and Ogedei to maintain the siege of Otrar, Genghis Khan and Tolui crossed the Kyzylkum Desert to attack Bukhara, which fell in February 1220, and Samarkand, which was taken in March 1220. Banakat was also occupied, Otrar fell in April 1220, and the Mongol armies from Banakat and Otrar joined Genghis Khan near Nasaf, where they spent the summer of 1220 resting the army and the horses. Jochi had taken all the towns along Syr Darya, including Sighnaq and Jend, by April 1220, then camped on the Kipchak steppes. Genghis Khan sent a 30,000–40,000 man army led by Jebe and Subutai and his own son-in-law Toghachar to hunt down the Shah.

The rapid fall of Transoxania further unnerved Shah Muhammad II, who began to retreat west along with Jalal al-Din. He had halted for a while at Nishapur, but when the Mongol army under Jebe and Subutai crossed the Amu Darya, the Shah moved across Persia, then eluded the Mongols by pretending to make for Baghdad, and eventually found refuge on an island in the Caspian Sea, where he died in December 1220, naming Jalal ad-Din his heir. The Mongol army sacked several cities, including Zaveh, Quchan, Tus, Qazvin and Ardabil, and then wintered in the Mughan steppes.

Jalal al-Din needed an army to confront the Mongols. The Sultan went to Gurganj, a city reportedly housing 90,000 troops, but the city officials preferred his brother Uzlaq Shah as the Sultan. After discovering a plot against his life, the Sultan with 300 cavalry crossed the Karakum Desert in 16 days and defeated a Mongol detachment near Nisa to reach Nishapur. Jalal al-Din intended to raise an army at Nishapur, but abandoned the city when Mongols arrived unexpectedly. The Mongols chased the Sultan across Khuistan, but Jalal al-Din managed to elude his enemies to reach Bost. Here, an army of 10,000 Turks commanded by his maternal uncle Amin Malik joined him, and the Sultan reached Ghazni after driving off a Mongol army from Qanhahar after a three-day battle.

=== Prelude ===
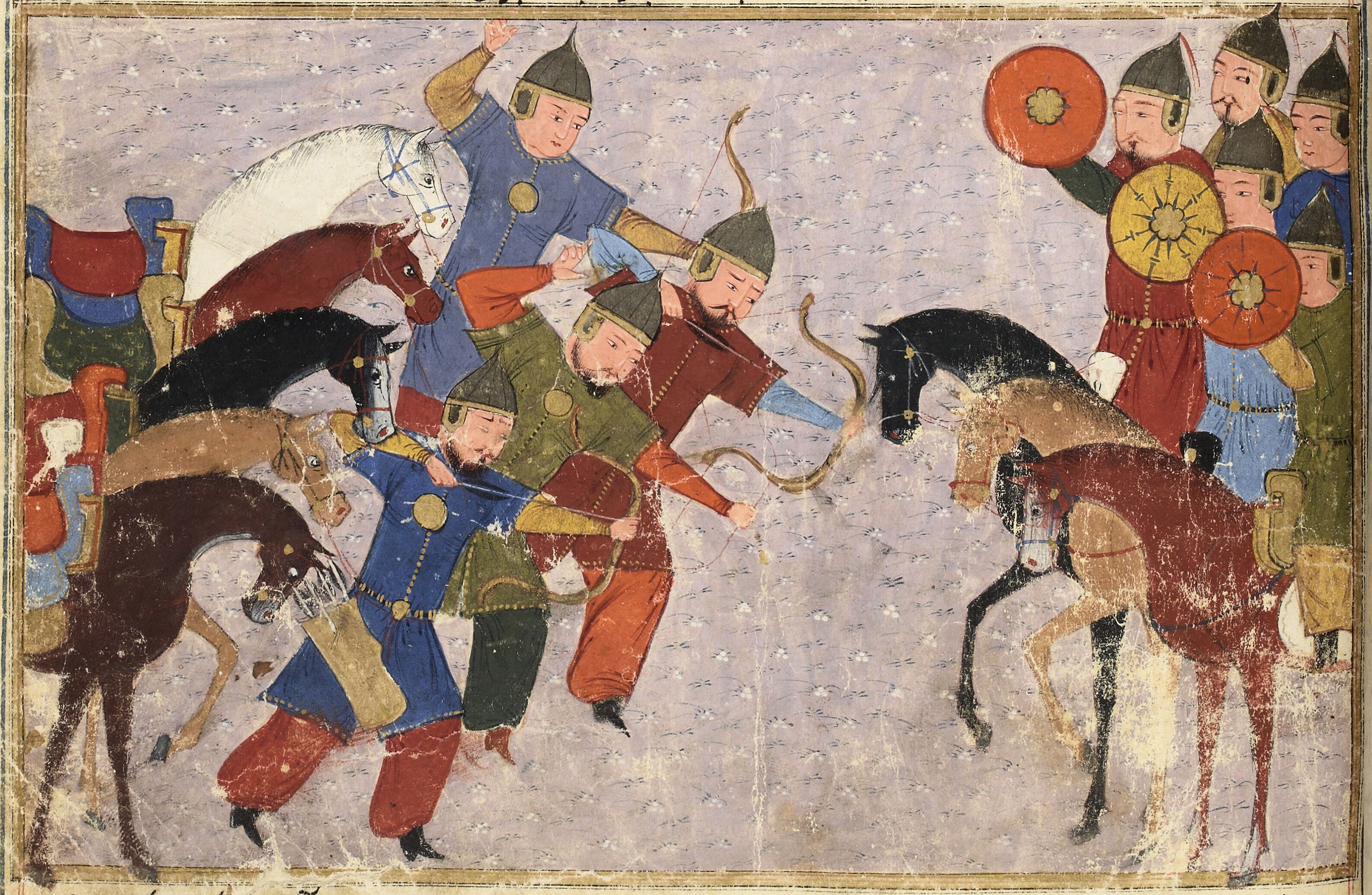
Battle of Vâliyân (Spring of 1221), in a miniature of Jami' al-tawarikh, Rashid al-Din, 1410-1430.

Jalal al-Din spent the summer of 1221 in Ghazni where thousands of people from all over Afghanistan joined his ranks to defend their homelands after hearing the fate of Bamyan. He assembled a coalition of Afghan and Turkic warriors. From there, he went first to Valiyan, which was under siege by the Mongols, defeated their two armies under the leaderships of Tekejik and Molger, and lifted the siege of Valiyan, with about 1,000 Mongol casualties. Jalal ad-Din regrouped at Parwan. A week later, Genghis Khan sent his chief justice Shigi Qutuqu to hunt down Jalal al-Din, but only gave the inexperienced general 30,000–50,000 troops. (Note: Modern scholarship varies on the armies' sizes. Mclynn Frank estimates 45,000–50,000 Mongols against 60,000–70,000 Khwarazmians.)

Medieval scholarship differed on the strength of the Mongol army. Ata Malik Juvayni reported Shigi Qutuqu's strengths as 30,000, Juzjani reported it as 45,000, and Ibn Abd Allah al-Umari reported it as 70,000. Juzjani, Nasawi, Juvayni, Ibn al-Athir and Handmir all report the Khwarazmian strength as 60,000.

However, modern scholarship differs on the strength of both armies. The lowest estimate for Jalal al-Din's strength is 30,000, while the highest is 120,000. In The Harper Encyclopedia of Military History, Richard and Trevor Dupuy give Jalal al-Din's force as 120,000. (Note: "While Genghis was gathering his sons' contingents together for another campaign, Jellaluddin with 120,000 men defeated an advance Mongol force of three toumans (30,000 men)...") Tucker similarly gives Jalal al-Din's strength as 120,000. (Note: At the head of an army of about 120,000 men, Jellaluddin, son of Mohammad Shah, meets and defeats 30,000 of Genghis Khan's Mongols in the Hindu Kush in the Battle of Pirvan.)

Estimates for Shigi Qutuqu's strength range between 30,000 and 70,000. Mclynn Frank estimates the Mongol forces were around 45,000–50,000, whereas he estimates Jalal al-Din had 60,000–70,000; he further adds that while the numbers are exaggerated, the proportion of Jalal al Din's army's numerical superiority is probably accurate. On the other hand, Carl Sverdrup assesses that Jalal al-Din probably had 15,000 men in total whereas Shigi Qutuqu commanded as many as 10,000 men. The larger Khwarazmian army was ill-equipped and consisted mostly of infantry, whereas Shigi Qutuqu's entire army was well-equipped cavalry.

== Battle ==
Shigi Qutuqu was overconfident after the continuous Mongol successes, and he quickly found himself on the back foot against the more numerous Khwarazmian force. The battle took place in a narrow valley, which was unsuitable for the Mongol cavalry.

Jalal al-Din had mounted archers, whom he ordered to dismount and fire on the Mongols. Jalal al-Din gave Saif al-Din Ighraq command of the left flank and Malik Khan the right flank, consisting of 10,000 soldiers. On the first day of the battle, Malik Khan's division pushed the Mongol left into their base. Because of the narrow terrain, the Mongols could not use their normal tactics. On the second day of the battle, to deceive the Khwarazmians, Shigi Qutuqu mounted straw warriors on spare remounts, which may have spared him from a killing stroke, but Jalal al-Din was not fooled by the ruse. On the third day, the Mongol right flank charged on Ighraq's division, and Ighraq's division responded by shooting arrows on foot to which the Mongols feigned flight. Ighraq's men charged, but 500 were killed when the Mongols suddenly counter-attacked. Seeing this, Jalal al-Din personally attacked the Mongols and forced them to flight. Large numbers of the Mongols were captured alive, and the Khwarazmians killed them by nailing stakes into their ears. Shigi Qutuqu was driven off in defeat, losing over half his army.

== Aftermath and legacy ==
According to Ibn Al-Athir's account, after the battle of Parwan was won, Jalal al-Din sent a message to Genghis Khan, stating:

In which locality do you want the battle to be, so that we may make our way to it?

Genghis Khan responded by sending a larger army under the leadership of one of his sons. Jalal al-Din confronted the new army when the army arrived at Kabul and the Mongols were defeated again. Carl Sverdrup on the other hand talks of 2 battles following the Battle of Parwan, 1 battle between a Khwarezmian army led by a general named Orkhan in which Khwarezmians were defeated and second battle between a Mongol general Caqan and Jalal al-Din in which Jalal al-Din triumphed. Sverdrup also mentions that "there might have been more than one action."

Regardless of whether those battles occurred or not, both contemporary and medieval scholarship agree that in the evening of the day the battle ended, a dispute over the division of the spoils, specifically a Mongolian white horse, led to the desertion of the Afghan contingent. Amin Malik, leader of the Turks and the Sultan's father-in-law, struck Saif al-Din Ighraq, leader of the Afghans, with a whip. Sultan Jalal ad-Din refused to discipline Amin Malik, and Ighraq reproached the Sultan, and he along with the Khalaj, Afghan, and some of the Qanqli troops deserted after nightfall.

Jalal ad-Din left Parwan for the Punjab with only 30,000 men after the Afghans abandoned him. When Genghis Khan heard the news of the defeats, he made forced marches to catch Jalal al-Din before he escaped into India. Genghis marched with Shigi Qutugu and instructed him on where he had gone wrong on the battleground. The Shah attempted to cross the Indus River to the area north of the present city of Kalabagh, Pakistan. However, the Mongols caught up with him on the banks of the Indus and defeated him, in what is now referred to as the Battle of the Indus.

The Battle of Parwan is considered a significant engagement, marking the first defeat of the Mongols in a pitched battle against a Muslim opponent. The outcome likely surprised the Mongol commanders, both because of the defeat and because the engagement occurred in an open-field battle, whereas most of the campaign had focused on besieging cities. It is also seen as the resurrection of the Khwarazmians, and contemporary Muslim accounts all hailed the victory. According to Rashid al-Din Hamadani's account, Genghis Khan personally visited the battlefield and the fallen Mongol soldiers, and addressing Shigi Qutuqu, said:

You did not know the place of battle, and you were both at fault.

The Khwarezmians started an insurgency after the news of Shigi Qutuqu's defeat at the battle of Parwan spread throughout the empire. Inspired by Jalal al-Din's back-to-back victories against the Mongol army, Kush Tegin Pahlawan led an insurgency in Merv and seized it successfully, followed by a successful attack on Bukhara. People in Herat also rebelled and deposed the Mongol vassal leadership. An insurgency leader named Muhammad the Marghani twice attacked Genghis Khan's camp at Baghlan and returned with loot. As a response, Genghis Khan sent a large army under the leadership of Ögedei Khan back to Ghazni. The Battle of Parwan had grave repercussions in Afghanistan, Turkmenistan, and Iran since the illusion of Mongol invincibility had been broken. Cities that had peacefully surrendered rose up in arms, which forced Genghis and his son Tolui to spend extra months subduing the revolts. Genghis Khan appointed Yelü Ahai to restore Mongol sovereignty in Samarkand and Bukhara; he managed to restore order in the cities in 1223.

== See also ==
- Siege of Bamyan

== Sources ==
- al-Athir, Ali ibn (2006). The Chronicle of Ibn al-Athir for the Crusading Period from al-Kamil fi'I-Ta'rikh. Translated by D. S. Richards. London and New York: Routledge Taylor & Francis Group. Part 3. ISBN 9780754640790.
- Asayesh, Maryam Ebadi (2017). Patriarchy and Power in Magical Realism. Cambridge Scholars Publishing. ISBN 978-1-5275-0082-2.
- Atwood, Christopher (2004). Encyclopedia of Mongolia and the Mongol Empire. United States of America: Facts On File, Inc. ISBN 978-1-4381-2922-8.
- Barthold, W. (1968). Turkestan Down to the Mongol Invasion (third ed.). Messers. Luzac and Company Ltd.
- Boyle, J. A., ed. (1968). The Cambridge History of Iran. Vol. 5. Cambridge University Press. ISBN 978-0-521-06936-6.
- Bregel, Yuri (2003). A Historical Atlas of Central Asia. Brill, Boston. ISBN 978-90-04-12321-2.
- Buniyatov, Z.M. (2015). A History of The Khorezmian State under the Anushteginids 1097 – 1231. IICAS Samarkand. ISBN 978-9943-357-21-1.
- De Hartog, Leo (2004). Genghis Khan: Conqueror of the World. Londres; Nueva York: Tauris Parke Paperbacks. ISBN 978-1-86064-972-1.
- Dupuy, Richard Ernest; Dupuy, Trevor Nevitt (1993). The Harper Encyclopedia of Military History: From 3500 BC to the Present. HarperCollins Publishers. ISBN 9780062700568.
- Elliot, Henry M. (1869). History of India As Told By Its Own Historians. Vol. II. Trübner & Co. London.
- Grousset, René (2003) [1970]. The Empire of the Steppes: A History of Central Asia. Rutgers University Press. ISBN 978-0-8135-1304-1.
- Jaques, Tony (2007). Dictionary of Battles and Sieges: P-Z. Greenwood Publishing Group. ISBN 978-0-313-33539-6.
- Juvaini, Ata-Malik (1997). Mirza Muhammad Qazwini (ed.). Genghis Khan: The History of the World Conqueror. Translated by John Andrew Boyle. Manchester University Press. ISBN 978-0-7190-5144-9.
- Mclynn, Frank (2015). Genghis Khan His Conquests, His Empire, His Legacy. Da Capo Press. ISBN 978-0-306-82396-1.
- Davis, Erik (2022). The Shah and the Great Khan: The Mongol-Khwarazm War of 1217–1221 (Master's thesis). Calgary, Canada: University of Calgary.
- Şahi̇n, Mustafa (2016). "Bir Yeniden Diriliş Öyküsü Parvan Şavaşı / A Resurrectıon Story: War Of Parwan". Turkish Studies. 11 (16): 115–130. doi:10.7827/TurkishStudies.9728. ISSN 1308-2140.
- Saunders, J. J. (2001). The History of the Mongol Conquests. University of Pennsylvania Press. ISBN 978-0-8122-1766-7. "He actually succeeded in routing a Mongol detachment at Parwan near Kabul in Afghanistan, 39 an event which raised many false hopes and led to fatal uprisings against Mongol rule in Mery, Herat and elsewhere in the autumn of 1221 ."
- Sverdrup, Carl (2017). The Mongol Conquests The Military Operations of Genghis Khan and Sübe'etei. West Midlands: Helion & Company Limited. ISBN 978-1-910777-71-8.
- Tanner, Stephen (2002). Afghanistan: A Military History from Alexander The Great to the Fall of The Taliban. DA CAPO Press. ISBN 0-306-81233-9.
- Tanner, Stephen (2009). Afghanistan - A Military History from Alexander the Great to the War Against the Taliban. Da Capo Press. p. 94.
- Toshmurodova, Sarvinoz Quvondiq qizi (July 2021). "Jaloliddin Manguberdi Is a Great Country Defender" (PDF). JournalNX. 7 (7): 46–51 – via Novateur Publications.
- Tucker, Spencer C., ed. (2010). A Global Chronology of Conflict: From the Ancient World to the Modern Middle East. Vol. I. ABC-CLIO.
- Tucker, Spencer C., ed. (2015). Wars That Changed History: 50 of the World's Greatest Conflicts. Santa Bárbara: ABC-CLIO. p. 117. ISBN 9781610697866.
