= Battle of the Indus =

1221 Mongol victory over the Khwarazmians

- Part of the Mongol invasion of the Khwarazmian Empire
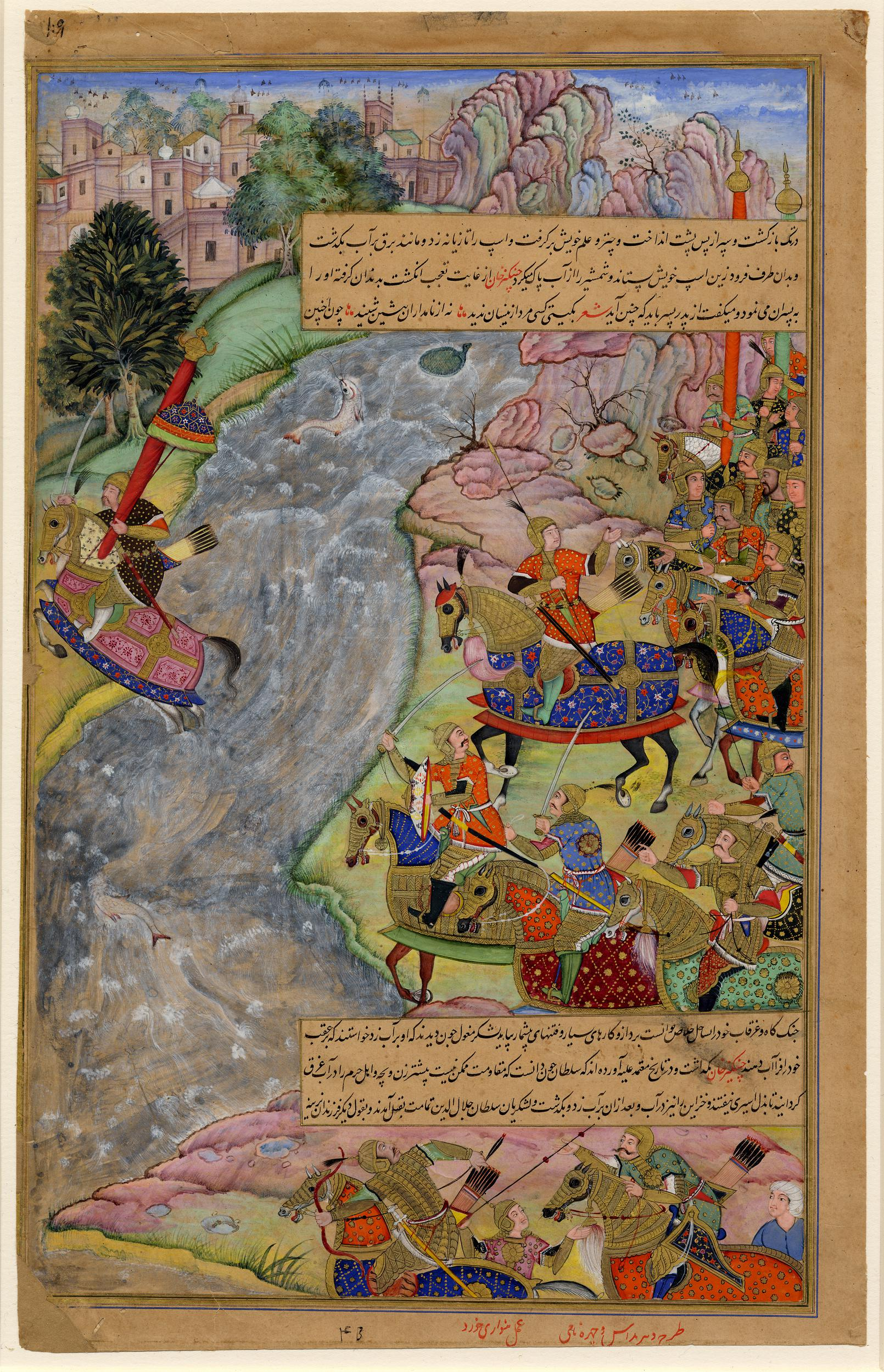
- Late 16th-century depiction of Jalal al-Din Mangburni fleeing the battle by crossing the Indus; Genghis Khan looks on.
Date	24 November 1221
Location	Near the Indus River, located in modern-day Pakistan 33.77°N 72.18°E
Result	Mongol victory
Territorial changes	Khwarazm and Khorasan annexed by Mongols

Belligerents
Mongol Empire	Khwarazmian Empire

Commanders and leaders
Genghis Khan; Chagatai Khan; Ögedei Khan	Jalal al-Din Mangburni; Amin Malik †; Temur Malik †

Strength
50,000 cavalry	3,000 cavalry with 700 bodyguards with 30,000–35,000 semi-irregular men

Casualties and losses
Unknown	Almost the entire army (30,000+ killed)
- Location within Pakistan Indus (South Asia)

The Battle of the Indus was fought on the banks of the Indus River, on 24 November 1221, between the armies commanded by Jalal al-Din of the Khwarazmian Empire, and Genghis Khan of the Mongol Empire. The battle, which resulted in an overwhelming Mongol victory, was the concluding engagement in the Mongol invasion of the Khwarazmian Empire.

After his father Muhammad II had died on an island in the Caspian Sea, Jalal al-Din assumed the title of Khwarazmshah and travelled eastwards. Escaping the Mongols several times, he reached Ghazni and started assembling a large force; he then defeated the Mongol commander Shigi Qutuqu at the Battle of Parwan. This upset victory drew the attention and ire of Genghis Khan, who gathered a force of at least 50,000 and moved towards the Shah, who had lost a large proportion of his force because of a dispute over plunder. Now unable to effectively combat the Khan, he retreated eastwards towards the Indus river; the Mongols caught up to the Khwarazmians on the morning they were due to cross the Indus.

The Shah's army, now numbering around 30,000, assumed a strong defensive position on the banks of the river. They acquitted themselves well in the early fighting, managing to drive back the Mongol forces despite being heavily outnumbered. However, after an elite Mongol detachment managed to outflank the Khwarazmians, the Shah realized the battle was lost; in full armour, he rode his horse off a cliff into the Indus. As a mark of respect for his enemy's bravery, the Khan ordered his archers not to fire, and so the Shah managed to gain the opposite bank; however, his family and nearly all his army were slaughtered.

== Background ==
Genghis Khan had invaded Khwarazm with an army of between 75,000 and 200,000 soldiers in late 1219. (Note: For details of army sizes during the invasion, see Mongol invasion of the Khwarazmian Empire: Opposing Forces.) Shah Muhammad II, wary of Mongol skill in battle and doubtful of his commanders' loyalties, adopted a defence in depth strategy based on garrisoning his cities, especially Otrar, Samarkand and Gurganj. However, the Khan demonstrated superior strategic ability, splitting the Shah's forces to take Bukhara in February 1220 and Samarkand in March; the border town of Otrar held out for six months until it fell in April. Genghis sent a 30,000 to 40,000 strong Mongol army led by Jebe and Subutai to hunt down the Shah, who had begun to flee west with his eldest son Jalal al-Din. The Mongol army sacked numerous cities during their long pursuit, including Tus, Qazvin and Ardabil; however, the Shah found refuge on an island in the Caspian Sea, where he died in December 1220.

Jalal al-Din reached the city of Gurganj, the former capital of the empire, after his father's death, but found that the nobility was hostile to him, preferring his half-brother Uzlaq-Shah. Discovering a plot against his life, Jalal al-Din left the city and set out southwards across the Karakum Desert, emerging near Nisa where he defeated a Mongol detachment. Meanwhile, two large Mongol forces, led by the Khan's two eldest sons Jochi and Chagatai, converged on Gurganj from the northeast and southeast respectively; the capture of the city would take another six months and additional Mongol forces, led by Ögedei, to be accomplished. At the same time, Genghis had sent his youngest son Tolui to conquer the region of Khorasan, which Tolui completed speedily and with extreme devastation — the cities of Merv, Nishapur were destroyed and their populations massacred, while Herat was betrayed to the Mongols and escaped destruction. Jalal al-Din narrowly escaped being caught at Nishapur, where he had hoped to raise an army; he evaded his pursuers and managed to reach Bost, where his maternal uncle Amin Malik joined him with a reasonable force. The Shah then moved to Ghazni, where many Khwarazmian loyalists, including Qurlaq, Khalaj and Turkmens, joined him and within a few weeks he had amassed a well-equipped, if not firmly united, army of around 65,000 soldiers.

== Battle of Parwan and prelude ==
After Jalal al-Din moved against some Mongol forces in the area, Genghis Khan sent Shigi Qutuqu with force of between thirty and fifty thousand to defeat the Shah; however, Qutuqu was unexpectedly defeated at the Battle of Parwan in the autumn of 1221. News of this defeat led to large rebellions in several cities, including Merv and Herat. Unfortunately for Jalal al-Din, a large proportion of his force, mostly Afghans under Saif al-Din Ighrak, deserted after the battle because of a dispute over spoils. The Shah knew that the sudden loss of nearly half his army would probably prove fatal, so he decided to seek refuge in India. He returned to Ghazni and then marched east, making for the Indus River to cross into India. However, his pace was slow because a large number of refugees was accompanying his army.

The Mongols had conducted two month-long sieges at Rang Castle and Bamyan, but Genghis Khan marched towards Ghazni after receiving news of the defeat at Parwan. The Mongols sent detachments ahead to seize several passes that led from Ghazni to Peshawar, so when the deserters under Ighrak finally decided to rejoin Jalal al-Din, he found the way barred. One Mongol detachment was defeated by Jalal al-Din at Gadriz, but the Mongols, travelling at the fastest possible pace, managed to catch up on the banks of the Indus, defeating his rearguard.

=== Battle deployment ===
Both armies formed up for battle at dawn. Jalal al-Din took command of the center with 5,000 troops, including 700 bodyguards in reserve. Amin Malik took command of the Turks on the right wing, while the Afghans manned the left wing, probably commanded by Temur Malik. The Shah anchored his left wing on a ridge that ran straight into the river, while the flank on the right wing was protected by the riverbank. With this placement, the Shah had taken away the Mongol advantage of fighting a mobile battle of outflanking manoeuvres, and by fighting in a confined space, their advantage of having superior numbers were reduced.

Genghis deployed his forces in a crescent-shape, pinning the Khwarazmians against the river; he personally commanded the reserve to make sure the Shah wouldn't be able to break through the Mongol lines and escape. The Mongol right was commanded by Chagatai and the left by his brother Ögedei. The Mongol army outnumbered Jalal al-Din's forces by a large margin, but they probably were exhausted from their forced march across the mountains and Genghis Khan may have engaged the enemy before his full force had gathered.

== Battle ==
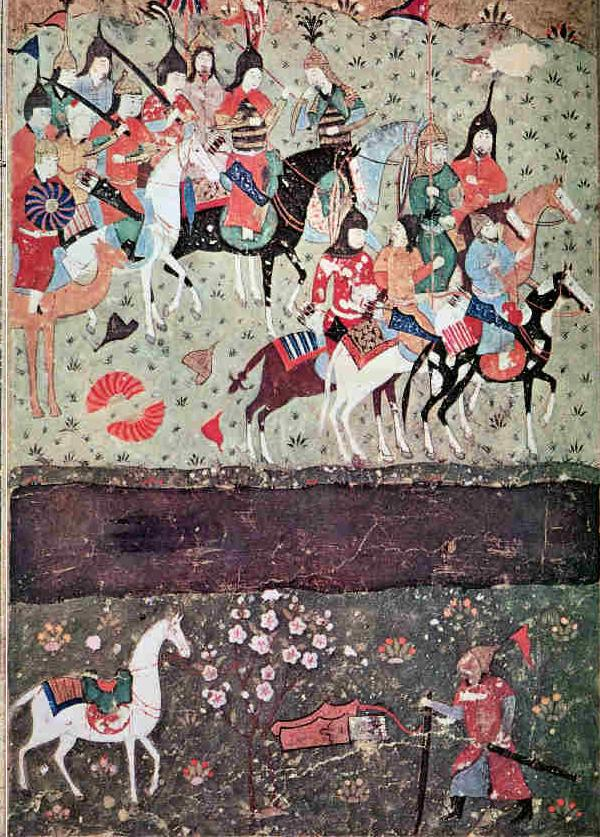
Mid-16th century depiction Jalal al-Din Khwarazmshah crossing the rapid Indus River, escaping Genghis Khan and his army

At dawn on 24 November, the battle began with the wings engaging each other; the Khwarazmian left held their strong defensive position despite the Khan consistently feeding in new troops, while Ögedei was driven back on the Mongol left. Realizing the strength of the ridge, Genghis sent a general named Bela Noyan with an elite bahadur tumen to climb it and outflank the Khwarazmians. Jalal al-Din attacked the Mongol center; although his personal biographer al-Nasawi has him reach Genghis Khan and put him to flight. Even though the Mongols could not use their arrows effectively in the crowded conditions, they managed to stop the Khwarazmian advance, killing Temur Malik in the mêlée.

Although many men were lost during Bela Noyan's climb, the Mongol detachment successfully scaled the ridge and attacked the Shah's left wing from the flank and rear. The Khwarazmian right was also retreating, and eventually broke; Amin Malik was intercepted and killed as he tried to flee to Peshawar. Even though it was evident that the battle was now lost, Jalal al-Din continued to fight until noon. After his maternal cousin Akhash Malik implored him to flee, he charged the now Mongol-controlled ridge, breaking through the lines. He then rode his horse off the edge of the 30-foot cliff, but managed to reach the opposite shore. Witnessing the feat and calling his sons to witness, Genghis forbade his archers to shoot the Shah and stated "Fortunate should be the father of such a son".

Although the Shah's life was spared, the lives of his men, most of whom had followed their leader's example, were not. In total, only around four thousand reached the other bank, with many being shot in the water by Mongol archers. The Shah's camp, harem and treasures were captured, and all male members of his family, including his seven year old and infant sons, were killed.

== Aftermath ==
Jalal al-Din managed to collect the survivors of his army; displaying his military acumen, he defeated local rulers and started establishing a small state in India. Genghis did not make any great effort to pursue his defeated foe, only sending troops when Jalal al-Din recrossed the Indus to bury his dead. The Khan was mostly occupied with subjugating the Afghans near Jalalabad, and the Mongol army then wintered in the Swat valley. Genghis Khan next sent his son Ögedei to sack Ghazni and subdue some of the Afghan mountain forts, a task which took fifteen months to fully accomplish. With that done, the Khan returned to Mongolia leisurely, reaching it in 1224–25.

A small force commanded by Dorbei Doqshin failed to make contact with Jalal al-Din; when he rejoined the Khan at Samarkand, he was immediately sent out once again on the same mission, with orders not to fail. They besieged the Shah for forty days in spring 1224, before the summer heat forced them to retreat. (Note: Dorbei may later have converted to Islam and joined Jalal al-Din, fearful of the Khan's response were he to return unsuccessfully again.) Jalal al-Din later received news from his brother Ghiyath al-Din, who had established dominion over the Khwarazmian territories in Western Iran and Iraq, inviting him to return and re-establish Khwarazmian power. Leaving his lands in the Punjab in the hands of a lieutenant, the Shah then marched across Makran, leaving India after a stay of three years, to set up his rule in parts of Persia and Anatolia. Before the Battle of Garni in 1225, Jalal al-Din sent a letter to Queen Rusudan demanding Georgian submission; Rusudan responded with an insulting letter, mocking how badly the Khwarazmshah had been beaten by Genghis Khan at the Indus.
