= Shigi Qutuqu =

Mongolian official (c. 1178 – 1260)

Shigi Qutuqu (Note: Mongolian: ᠰᠢᠭᠢᠬᠤᠲᠤᠭ, romanized: Šigi Qutuqu, Chinese characters: 失吉忽秃忽.) (c. 1178 – 1260) was a high-ranking official during the early decades of the Mongol Empire. The adopted son of the empire's founder Temüjin (later entitled Genghis Khan) and his wife Börte, Shigi Qutuqu played an important role in the codification of Mongol law, serving with distinction as an administrator in North China. He may also have been a major source for the Secret History of the Mongols, which portrays him very favourably.

Although the Secret History states that Shigi Qutuqu was adopted by Hö'elün, Temüjin's mother, chronological inconsistencies make this account improbable. The foundling was brought up in Temüjin's household and was one of the first Mongols to become literate. The Secret History exaggerates his role in the years after the empire's foundation, but Shigi Qutuqu was nevertheless appointed to several high-ranking legal positions, in which he served during the Mongol conquest of the Jin dynasty. He was the commander during the only Mongol defeat of the western campaign against Khwarazmia, being overcome by Jalal al-Din at the 1221 Battle of Parwan.

Shigi Qutuqu continued his career as an official during the reign of his adoptive brother Ögedei Khan, Genghis's successor. He conducted a census of North China in 1235–1236 which allowed the Mongol administration to overhaul its fiscal policies. While some contemporaries found his decrees and judgements oppressive and biased, others praised his honesty and judicial integrity. Having survived power struggles during the reigns of Güyük and Möngke, Shigi Qutuqu died at the age of 81 during the Toluid Civil War.

== Early life ==
The Secret History of the Mongols and Rashid al-Din's Jami' al-tawarikh both provide details (Note: The Secret History was composed between 1228 and 1260, while Rashid al-Din was writing in the early fourteenth century.) of the early life of Shigi Qutuqu, but the accounts differ greatly. According to the Secret History, after the Mongol (Note: At this point in time, the word "Mongols" only referred to the members of one tribe in northeast Mongolia; because this tribe played a central role in the formation of the Mongol Empire, their name was later used for all the tribes.) leader Temüjin (later titled Genghis Khan) had led a raid against a Tatar camp named Naratu Šitü’en, his plundering troops found a boy abandoned in the camp. He was recognised to be of aristocratic descent as he was wearing a nose ring made of gold and a silk jerkin lined with sable. The Secret History also records that Hö'elün, Temüjin's mother, adopted the boy as her sixth child, naming him Shigi Qutuqu. This account is, however, difficult to believe. The raid on Naratu Šitü’en can be dated fairly precisely to a campaign Temüjin fought in alliance with the Kereit chieftain Toghrul and the Chinese Jin dynasty in May–June 1196, but Shigi Qutuqu was already prominent in Mongol society by 1206, which is implausible if he were a small child a decade earlier. He would also have been decades younger than his adoptive siblings. By depicting him as a noble at birth and later the adopted brother of Temüjin, this version may have intended to position Shigi Qutuqu as a more senior member of Mongol society.

According to Rashid al-Din's account, Shigi Qutuqu's adoption took place more than a decade earlier. Al-Din records that when Temüjin and his wife Börte were still childless, they found a young boy and raised him as their son. If accurate, this incident would have occurred in the early 1180s as Börte's eldest son Jochi was born in 1184 at the earliest. Rashid al-Din's explanation, which draws upon natural relationships, is considered more plausible by modern historians such as Paul Ratchnevsky and Christopher Atwood. The comfort the adoption of Shigi Qutuqu brought Börte, who may have been depressed due to her difficulties conceiving, is sufficient to explain the honour and attention subsequently paid to him. It also clarifies a scene reported after Börte's death, in which Shigi Qutuqu beat his hands upon her grave, wailing O, sayin eke minu! (lit. Oh, my good mother!).

Two incidents in Shigi Qutuqu's childhood were transmitted by Rashid al-Din. In one, he managed to subdue a herd of gazelles in a winter blizzard; in the other, he had a role in saving Tolui, Temüjin's youngest legitimate son, from a Tayici'ut bandit. In around 1204, Temüjin appointed the Uighur scribe Tatar Tong'a as a tutor for his sons; Shigi Qutuqu took to this new avenue adeptly, recording his adoptive father's judgements and decrees in concert with his tutor.

== Under Genghis Khan ==
During the great kurultai (lit. assembly) of 1206, Temüjin, newly entitled Genghis Khan, appointed many of his leading commanders to high positions in the new Mongol state. Among them, Muqali and Bo'orchu were honoured above all others, receiving legal protection and command of wings of the Mongol army. Shigi Qutuqu took offence to this generosity, with the Secret History recording his words as follows: "Have Bo'orchu and Muqali rendered greater service than others? Have they given more of their strength than others? When it comes to distributing rewards I appear to have rendered less service [than they]!"

Genghis Khan's response, as recorded in the Secret History, was to instruct Shigi Qutuqu to "punish the thieves and put right the lies" by documenting all legal details, including those concerning rewards distribution, in a köke debter (lit. blue book). He entrusted Shigi Qutuqu with legal jurisdiction throughout the entire Mongol nation, making him the first jarghuchi (lit. judge) alongside Genghis's own half-brother Belgutei, who was appointed Minister of State. Modern historians consider this account biased: Ratchnevsky suggests that the Secret History, seeking to demonstrate that Genghis Khan was influenced by those around him, "obviously exaggerates Shigi Qutuqu's authority", while Atwood believes that the chronicle conflated the events of the 1206 kurultai with subsequent appointments, when Shigi Qutuqu may have replaced Belgutei. Nevertheless, Shigi Qutuqu was at some point charged with maintaining the laws of the Mongols, possibly by establishing a kind of case law, as was later recorded by Rashid al-Din. He probably did not compile these records personally, and instead supervised scribes also taught by Tatar Tong'a.

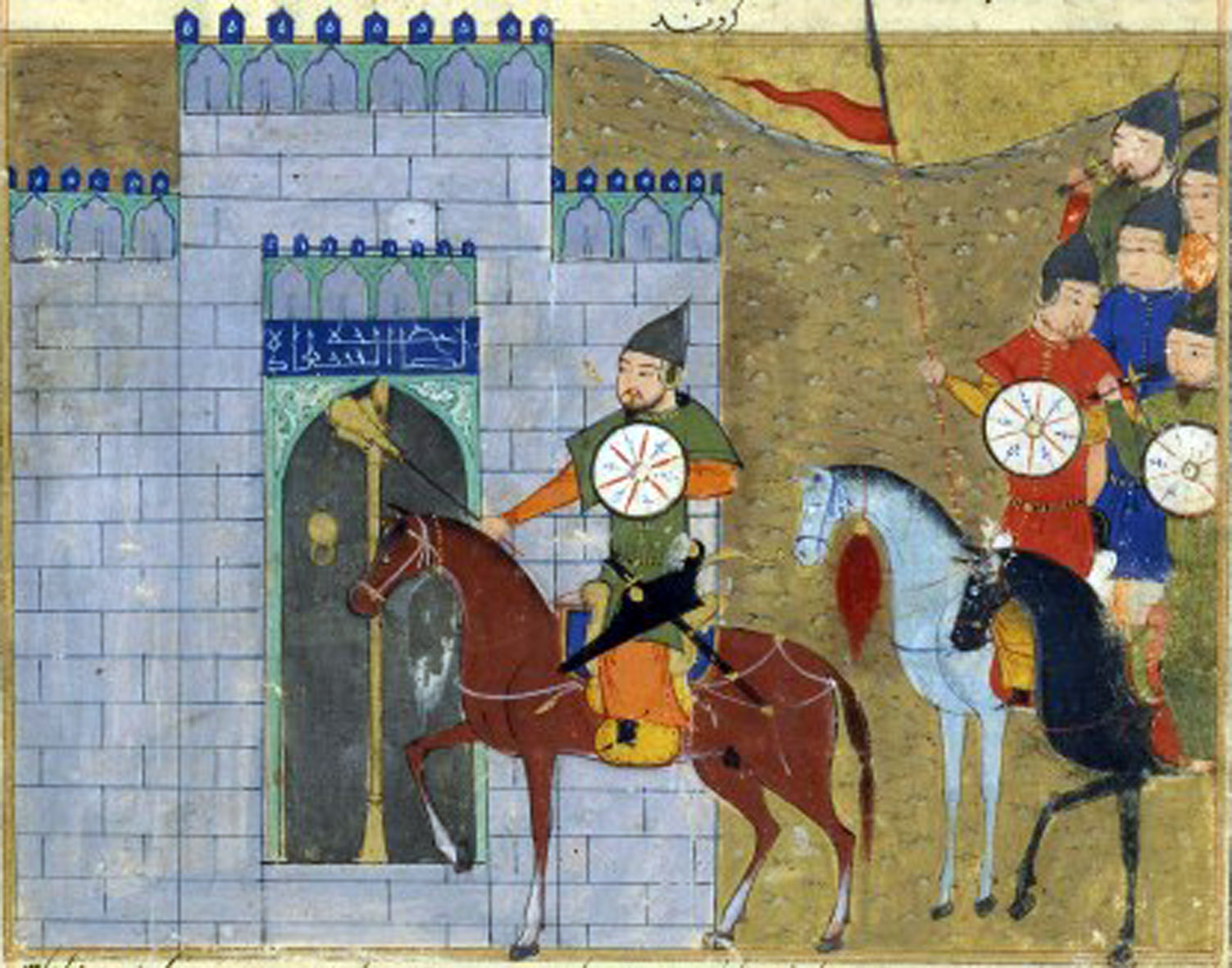
The capture of Zhongdu, depicted in the Jami al-tawarikh (Bibliothèque nationale de France, Paris)

Shigi Qutuqu participated in the first Mongol campaign against the Jin dynasty in North China. After Emperor Xuanzong fled south to Kaifeng, the city of Zhongdu fell to the Mongols after a long siege on 31 May 1215. Although the city was thoroughly plundered, Genghis Khan personally dispatched Shigi Qutuqu to secure and confiscate the Jin dynasty's treasury. For his honest accounting and recording of the plunder, he was praised highly by Genghis Khan—an event not only recorded in the Secret History and by Rashid al-Din but also in the late thirteenth-century Shengwu qinzheng lu. The History of Yuan, composed c. 1370, notes that Shigi Qutuqu took administrative roles following the occupation of northern China, with his remit including the appointments of minor officials.

Leading the imperial vanguard during the Mongol invasion of the Khwarazmian Empire in Central Asia, Shigi Qutuqu was in command during the Battle of Parwan, the first defeat of the campaign for the Mongols. This reverse was described in detail by Rashid al-Din and other Persian chroniclers such as al-Nasawi and Ata-Malik Juvayni, and more laconically by the Mongol chronicles: the Secret History, the Shengwu qinzheng lu, and the History of Yuan. According to the Persian chroniclers, Shigi Qutuqu had sacked and burned the city of Ghazni with around 10,000 soldiers and been involved in the capture of Nishapur, before helping to besiege Merv. He was subsequently dispatched with around 30,000 men to defeat the renegade Khwarazmian prince Jalal al-Din Mangburni in early 1221 but was repulsed by his enemy after two days of hard fighting, narrowly escaping a painful death at the hands of Jalal al-Din's forces. News of the Mongol defeat triggered an uprising in the city of Herat, which had previously submitted and which was subsequently annihilated.

Upon hearing of his adopted son's defeat, Genghis Khan masked his private distress with anger and set out to avenge the loss with his three elder sons—Jochi, Chagatai, and Ögedei. He criticised Shigi Qutuqu's choice of battlefield, and noted that he thought his adopted son had been spoiled by constant victories. At the Battle of the Indus, during which Genghis comprehensively defeated Jalal al-Din, Shigi Qutuqu was appointed to guard the captured Khwarazmian soldiers.

== Under Ögedei Khan ==
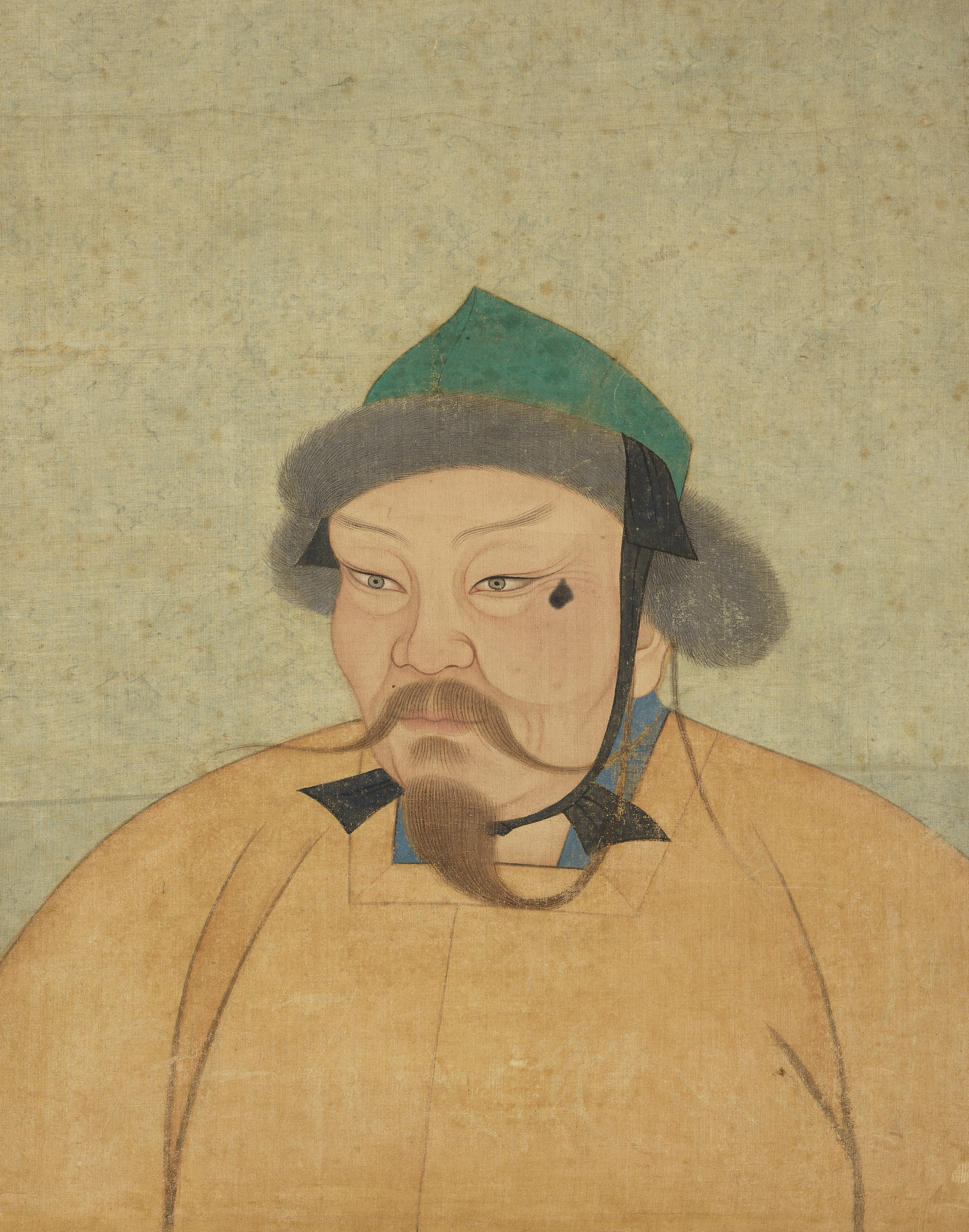
A Yuan dynasty portrait of Ögedei Khan

Upon Ögedei's accession to the Mongol throne after Genghis's death in 1227, he honoured his adopted sibling by naming him "elder brother" and placing him after his sons in the Mongol order of precedence. Shigi Qutuqu participated in the 1231 campaign against the Jin under the command of Tolui and was involved in action along the Yellow River; he was assigned to the service of Sorghaghtani Beki after her husband Tolui's death and was present at the fall of Kaifeng. He also briefly participated in a 1235 campaign against the Southern Song dynasty under the command of Köchü, Ögedei's third son.

As a leading Mongol scholar and official, Shigi Qutuqu was appointed in mid-1234 to the position of chief jarghuchi in Northern China. Acting in concert with the Chinese official Yelü Chucai, he executed a general census of the captured territories from Yanjing in 1235–1236. Medieval historians credit him with judicial integrity and administrative quality, and modern historians ascribe a good part of the success of Ögedei's fiscal reforms to Shigi Qutuqu's actions and policies. He was however known to favour Buddhist adherents such as the monk Haiyun, whom he consulted for advice on matters practical and personal; Haiyun took advantage of this connection to obtain concessions for the Buddhist population during Mongol rule. Authors such as Liu Bingzhong blame him for high corvée labour assignments and a generally repressive economic atmosphere, while the Song dynasty ambassador Xu Ting termed high household taxes and financial excesses "dreadful".

The remainder of Shigi Qutuqu's life is uncertain. As a senior member of the Mongol imperial family, he probably returned to Karakorum to participate in the kurultai following the death of Güyük in 1248; (Note: Güyük was the son of Ögedei (d. 1241).) he managed to avoid death in the subsequent power struggles, possibly due to his divided loyalties between the Ögedeid and Toluid branches of the Borjigin imperial family. Having survived the new khagan Möngke (d. 1259), Shigi Qutuqu died in 1260 during the Toluid Civil War. It is unknown what side he took in the dispute, fought between Tolui's sons Ariq Böke and Kublai.

== Legacy ==
Shigi Qutuqu laid the foundations for legal procedures across the entire empire through his early judicial activities. Under the name Siri Qutug, he was a central figure in the legends surrounding Genghis Khan until the late Middle Ages. The daughter of his son San-la married a high-ranking military engineer who established a private academy in Honan; their son Mu-yen Temur became a renowned book collector.

A significant number of scholars have connected Shigi Qutuqu with some role in the authorship of the Secret History of the Mongols. On the surface, the literate Shigi Qutuqu, who had grown up in Temüjin's household and had thus been personally involved in many important events, was one of the best-qualified Mongols to write such a history. The text itself is also very favourable to him—it discusses his successes very fully but dismisses his loss at Parwan in one sentence. The Secret History also completely ignores the career of Chinqai (c. 1169 – 1252), a leading Mongol official whose career rivalled Shigi Qutuqu's, and deprecates Muqali's career. However, Atwood has noted significant irregularities in the Secret History which Shigi Qutuqu would have been especially unlikely to make; he theorises that Shigi Qutuqu was instead one of the work's primary sources.

In modern-day Mongolia, Shihihutug University in Ulaanbaatar is named after Shigi Qutuqu; a statue of him, designed by the Mongolian sculptor Ochirbold, was erected in 2023 at the main campus.
