= Banakat =

Archaeological site in Uzbekistan

- Location of Banakat in Uzbekistan Banakat (Uzbekistan)
- 40°45′59″N 68°54′04″E
- Location: Uzbekistan

Banākat, Banākath, Fanākat, or Fanākath was a town on the upper Syr Darya in Transoxiana (present-day Uzbekistan, Central Asia).

The second part of these names, kat or kath, is an Eastern Iranian (Soghdian) compound meaning town. Its other forms are kāt, kāth, kant, kand as in Samarkand and Chāchkand (now Tashkent). It is similar to the Persian suffix '-kada'. Banokat, Fanokat, Sharqiya, Shahrukhiya is an ancient city ruin (1st - 18th centuries ) located on the right bank of the Syrdarya, on the edge of the caravan road at the confluence of the Ohangaron (Ilaq) River with the Syrdarya.

== Archeology ==
Banokat was discovered by the amateur archaeologist D. K. Zatsepin (1876), Ye. studied by T. Smirnov (1894, 1896). Since 1973 Shosh - Ilaq expedition (Yu.F. Buryakov ) investigates. According to researches, at first (1st century) it did not have a defensive wall, the river around it, as well as ravines, acted as a means of natural defense. The territory of Banokat is 22 ha, and the plot occupies about 1 ha. 12-13 a . expanded at the beginning (140 ha); it consisted of an ark, 3 cities and a rabad. As a result of the excavations, various ceramic objects (decorated jug, cup, glazed plate, etc.), coins and jewelry were found. In Banokat jewelry, textiles, pottery, glassmaking and other advanced products were manufactured, copper and silver coins were minted.

== History ==
Banākat was located near Khujand in present-day Uzbekistan. It was destroyed during the Mongol invasion (1220 BC). At the time of his invasion, Chingis Khan divided his army into four:

- one part under Jochi to capture cities around Syr Darya including Khujand and Banākat
- one part under Chagatai and Ögedei to capture Otrar
- two other parts under Tolui and himself to capture Samarkand.

In 1392 town was rebuilt by Timur (Tamerlane) and renamed Shahrukhiya after his son Shahrukh. At the beginning of the 18th century, it was destroyed as a result of internecine wars. A part of the Banokat ruins was washed away by the Syr Darya river.

== Famous people from Banakat ==
There are several Persians called Banākati (i.e., of or related to Banākat), some of them born in Banākat and some born elsewhere:

- Amir (meaning minister) Ahmad Banākati: (killed 1282 CE / 681 AH), the finance minister and vizier of Qubilai Khan
- Mohammad Banākati (in full: Tājeddin Abulfazl Mohammad ibn Mohammad Banākati, died 1283 CE / 682 AH): a Persian religious scholar and father of Davoud and Ali Banākati (see below).
- Abu Sulayman Banakati (died 1330): Persian poet and historian who wrote Rawzat al-Ulu al-Albāb fi Ma'rifat Tawārikh al-Akābir wa al-Ansāb (Persian: روضة الوالالباب فی معرفة تاریخ الاکابر والانساب Garden of the Learned to Know the History of Great Men and Genealogy). This book is also known as Tārikh-i Banākati. Davoud Banākati wrote this book in 1317 CE / 717 AH for Abu Said Bahatur. He was poet laureate (malek ol-shoara) of Ghazan Khan court.
- Ali Banākati (in full: Sayyid Nizāmeddin Ali ibn Mohammad Banākati, died 1299 CE / 699 AH): a great mystic and Sufi from Tabriz, brother of Davoud Banākati.
- Nāsekh Banākati (in full: Abul-Mozaffar Qutbeddin Ahmad ibn Mahmoud ibn Abu-Bakr, died after 1272 CE / 671 AH) a well-known and high-quality copyist and calligrapher who was contemporary with Khwaja Nasireddin Tusi and copied several of his works and met him in Maragha observatory.
