= Siege of Bukhara =

1220 siege and sack by Genghis Khan's Mongol army

- Part of the Mongol invasion of the Khwarazmian Empire
Date	February 1220
Location	Bukhara, present-day Uzbekistan 39°46′40″N 64°24′37″E
Result	Mongol victory

Belligerents
Mongol Empire	Khwarazmian Empire

Commanders and leaders
Genghis Khan; Tolui	Gür-Khan

Strength
Modern estimates range from 30,000 to 50,000	Modern estimates range from 2,000 to 20,000

Casualties and losses
Unknown	Most of the garrison
- Location of the siege on a map of modern Uzbekistan Bukhara (West and Central Asia)

The siege of Bukhara took place in February 1220, during the Mongol invasion of the Khwarazmian Empire. Genghis Khan, ruler of the Mongol Empire, had launched a multi-pronged assault on the Khwarazmian Empire ruled by Shah Muhammad II. While the Shah planned to defend his major cities individually, the Mongols laid siege to the border town of Otrar, and struck further into Khwarazmia.

The city of Bukhara was a major centre of trade and culture in the Khwarazmian Empire, but was located far from the border with the Mongol Empire, and so the Shah had allocated fewer than 20,000 soldiers to defend it. A Mongol force, estimated to number between 30,000 and 50,000 men and commanded by Genghis himself, traversed the Kyzylkum Desert, previously considered impassable for large armies. Bukhara's defenders were caught by surprise and, after a failed sortie, the outer city surrendered within three days on 10 February. Khwarazmian loyalists continued to defend the citadel for less than two weeks, before it was breached and taken.

The Mongol army killed everybody in the citadel and enslaved most of the city's population. The Mongols appropriated the work of skilled craftsmen and artisans, conscripting other inhabitants into their armies. Although Bukhara was then destroyed by fire, the destruction was relatively mild compared to elsewhere; within a short space of time the city was once again a centre of trade and learning, and it profited greatly from the Pax Mongolica.

== Background ==
On the eve of the Mongol invasion, Yaqut al-Hamawi's geographical survey described Bukhara as "among the greatest cities of Central Asia". (Note: Al-Hamawi gives a less flattering portrait of the densely populated centre, citing poets who criticize the "filth and prevalence of uncleanliness in its streets".) With a population of close to 300,000 and a library of 45,000 books, the city rivalled Baghdad as a centre of learning and culture. The Po-i-Kalyan mosque, which had been commissioned in 1121, was one of the largest in the world, and contained the Kalyan minaret. It was a big center of trade, the Bukhara slave trade having been a major center of the slave trade of Central Asia for centuries by 1220. The city was guarded by the Ark of Bukhara, a fortress established in the fifth century which served as a citadel; the farmlands were extensively irrigated using water from the River Zeravshan.

During the twelfth century, the city had been under the rule of the Qarakhanids, who had historically controlled many of the richest cities in the area, such as Samarkand, Tashkent and Fergana. Nominally vassals of the Qara-Khitai Khanate, the Qarakhanids were allowed to operate autonomously, due to the large population and territory under their control. By 1215, they had been subjugated by the Khwarazmians, also former vassals of the Qara-Khitai, who had expanded from Gurganj into the power vacuum left by the collapsing Seljuk Empire. In 1218, Khwarazmshah Muhammad II was Sultan of Hamadan, Iran and Khorasan, and had established dominion over the Ghurids and the Eldiguzids. The Khwarazmian dynasty had usurped the Qara-Khitai, already destabilized by refugees fleeing the conquests of Genghis Khan, who had begun to establish hegemony over the Mongol tribes.

Following the defeat of their common enemy, the Naiman prince Kuchlug, relations between the Mongols and the Khwarazmids were initially strong, but the Shah soon grew apprehensive of the Mongols. The chronicler al-Nasawi attributes this to an unintended earlier skirmish with Mongol troops, whose speed and mobility frightened the Shah. In 1218, the Shah allowed Inalchuq, the governor of Otrar, to arrest a Mongol trade caravan, and to seize its goods. Seeking a diplomatic resolution, Genghis Khan sent three envoys to Gurganj, but Muhammad humiliated them, publicly executing one. Outraged, Genghis left his ongoing war against the Chinese Jin dynasty, and rode westwards in 1219 with most of his army, leaving only a minimal force behind under the command of Muqali.

=== Prelude ===
There are conflicting reports as to the size of the total Mongol invasion force. The highest figures were calculated by classical Muslim historians such as Juzjani and Rashid al-Din. Modern scholars such as Morris Rossabi have indicated that the total Mongol invasion force could not have been more than 200,000; John Masson Smith gives an estimate of around 130,000. The minimum figure of 75,000 is given by Carl Sverdrup, who hypothesizes that the tumen (the largest Mongol military unit) had often been overestimated in size. The Mongol armies arrived in Khwarazmia in waves: first, a vanguard led by Genghis' eldest son Jochi and the general Jebe crossed the Tien Shan passes, and started laying waste to the towns of the eastern Fergana Valley. Jochi's brothers Chagatai and Ogedai then descended on Otrar and besieged it. Genghis soon arrived with his youngest son Tolui, and split the invasion force into four divisions: while Chagatai and Ogedai were to remain besieging Otrar, Jochi was to head northwest in the direction of Gurganj. A minor detachment was also sent to take Khujand, but Genghis himself took Tolui and around half of the army – between 30,000 and 50,000 men – and headed westwards.

Campaigns of Genghis Khan between 1207 and 1225

The Khwarazmshah faced many problems. His empire was vast and newly formed, with a still-developing administration. His mother, Terken Khatun, still wielded substantial power in the realm—Peter Golden termed the relationship between the Shah and his mother "an uneasy diarchy", which often acted to Muhammad's disadvantage. The Shah distrusted most of his commanders, the only exception being his eldest son and heir Jalal al-Din, whose military skill had been critical at the Irghiz River skirmish the previous year. If the Khwarazmshah sought open battle, as many of his commanders wished, he would have been outmatched by the Mongol army, in both the size of the army and its skill. The Shah thus decided to distribute his forces as garrison troops in the empire's most important cities. Since it was far from the presumed theatre of war, Bukhara was allotted relatively few troops. As with the Mongol army, there is also debate as to the size and composition of the Shah's forces. The chronicler Juvaini states that 50,000 were sent to aid Otrar, and that there were at least 20,000 in Bukhara. According to Sverdrup, there were between two and five thousand men at Bukhara. Deducing the Shah's strategy, Genghis bypassed the stronghold of Samarkand and traversed 300 miles of the Kyzylkum Desert to reach Bukhara on 7 February 1220. As contemporaries thought the Kyzylkum impassable by large armies, modern historians such as H. Desmond Martin and Timothy May have considered the manoeuvre a tactical masterstroke.

== Siege ==
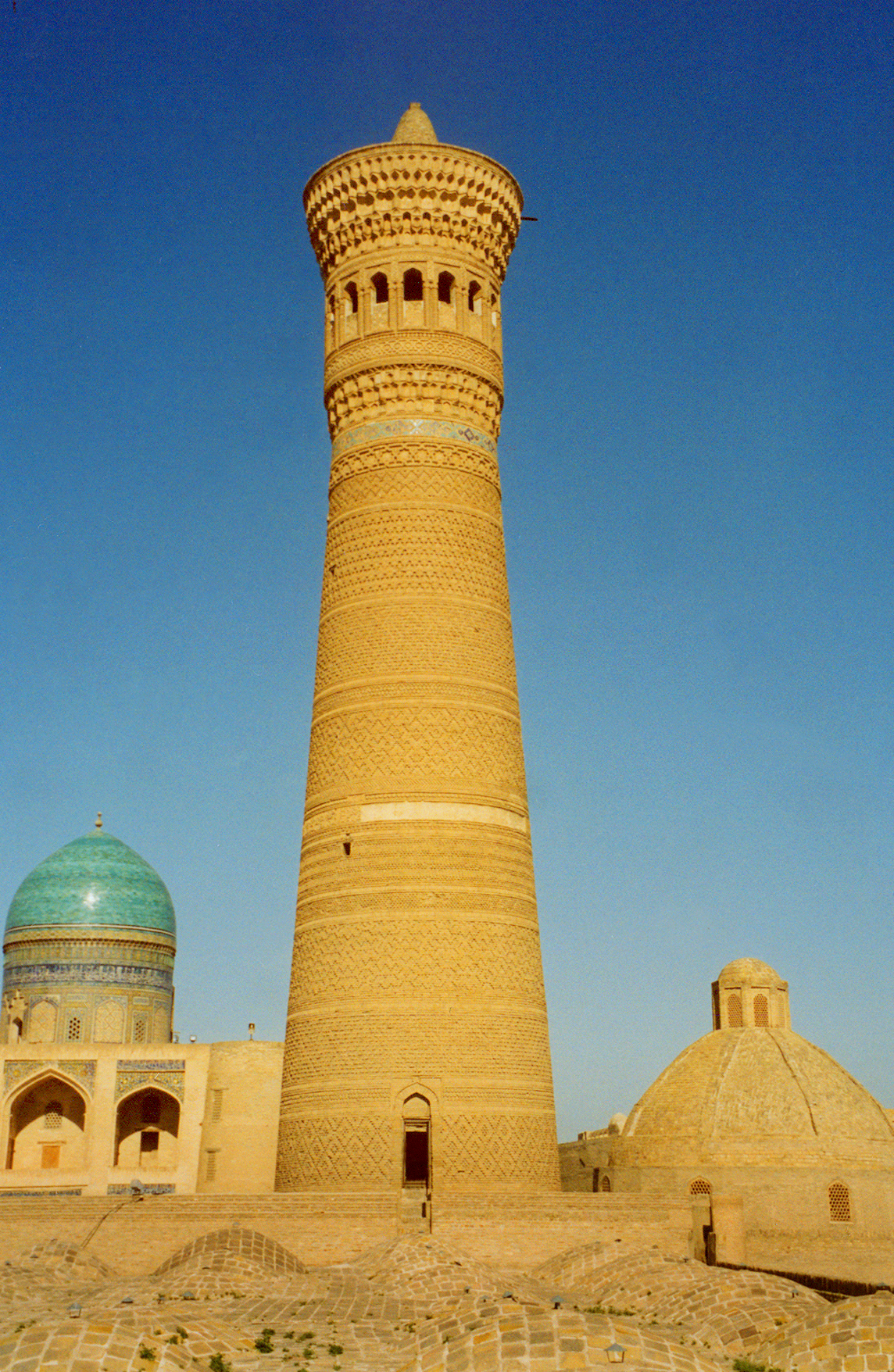
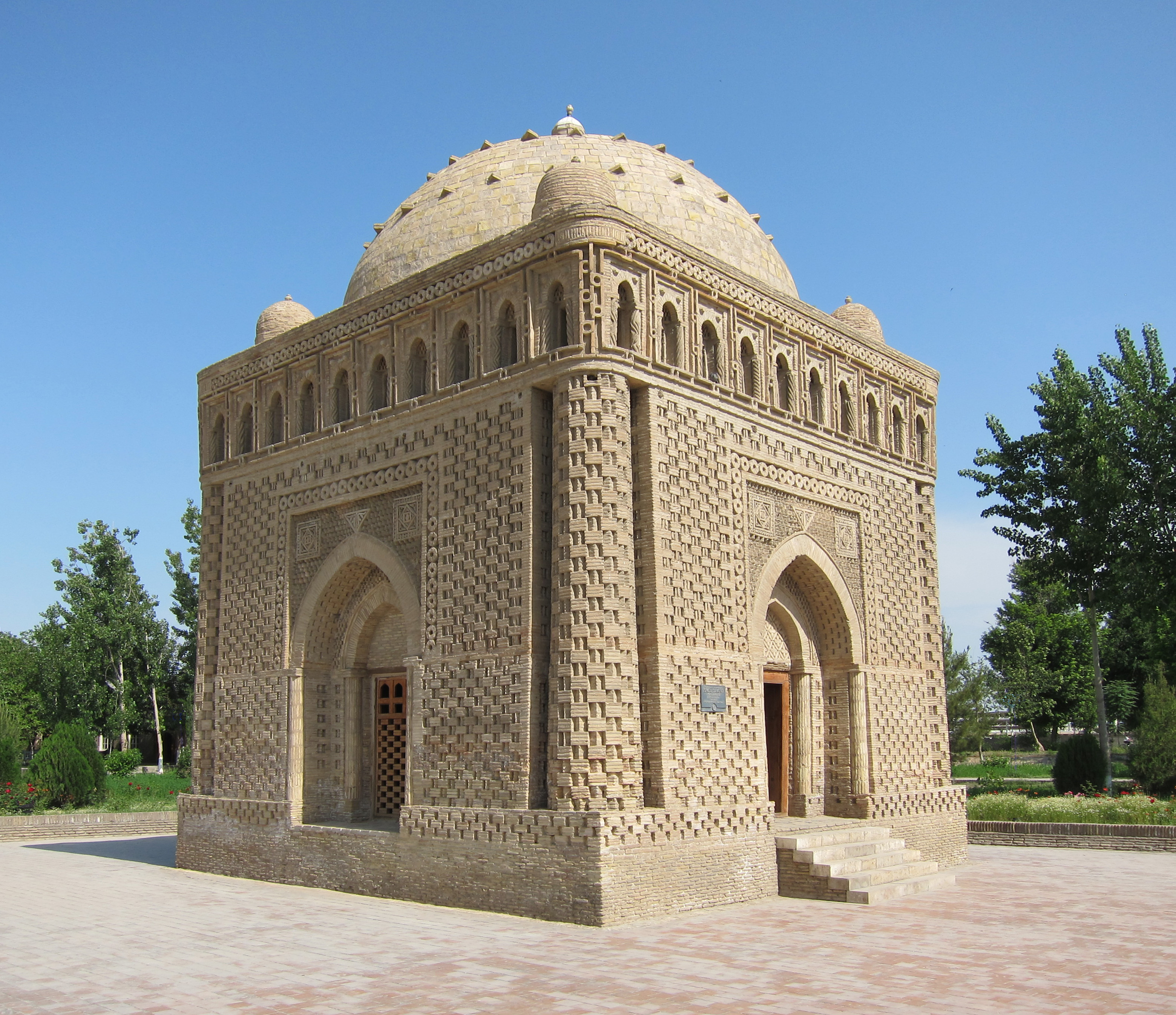
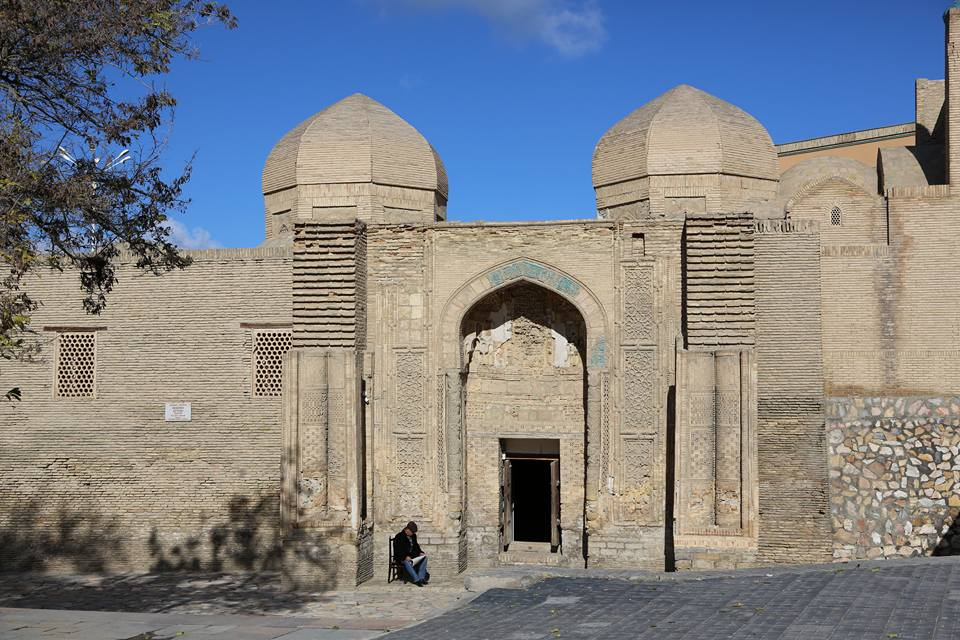
Buildings that survived the siege. Clockwise from top left: The Kalyan minaret; the Samanid Mausoleum, which survived because it was buried in mud; and the Magok-i-Attari Mosque.

The Shah was caught completely unaware. He had anticipated that Genghis would attack Samarkand first, where both his field army and the garrison stationed at Bukhara would relieve the siege. The Khan's march through the Kyzylkum had left the Khwarazmian field army impotent, unable to either engage the enemy or help his people. Juvaini records that the garrison at Bukhara was commanded by a man named Gür-Khan; the early 20th century historian Vasily Bartold suggested that this may have been Jamukha, an old friend-turned-enemy of Genghis. Most recent historians consider this unlikely, as Jamukha is believed to have been executed in 1206.

The major military action of the siege came on the second or third day, when the Sultan's troops, numbering between 2,000 and 20,000, sallied forth; Juvaini records that they were annihilated by the Mongols on the banks of the river:

When these forces reached the banks of the Oxus, the patrols and advance parties of the Mongol army fell upon them and left no trace ... On the following day from the reflection of the sun the plain seemed to be a tray filled with blood.

— Ata-Malik Juvaini, Tarikh-i Jahangushay

The historian Paul Buell notes that the sortie, conducted solely by the Sultan's auxiliary troops and not by the city garrison, may have just been an attempt to flee; he attributes their willingness to leave to the fact that Bukhara was a very recent Khwarazmian conquest, having been taken from the Qarakhanids less than a decade previously. On 10 February the town surrendered. The only resistance now came from a small band of loyalists in the citadel. The citadel was built to the highest specifications, but the Khan had brought experts in siege warfare from China; a breach was made after ten days using incendiary and gunpowder weapons, and the citadel fell on the twelfth day.

== Aftermath ==
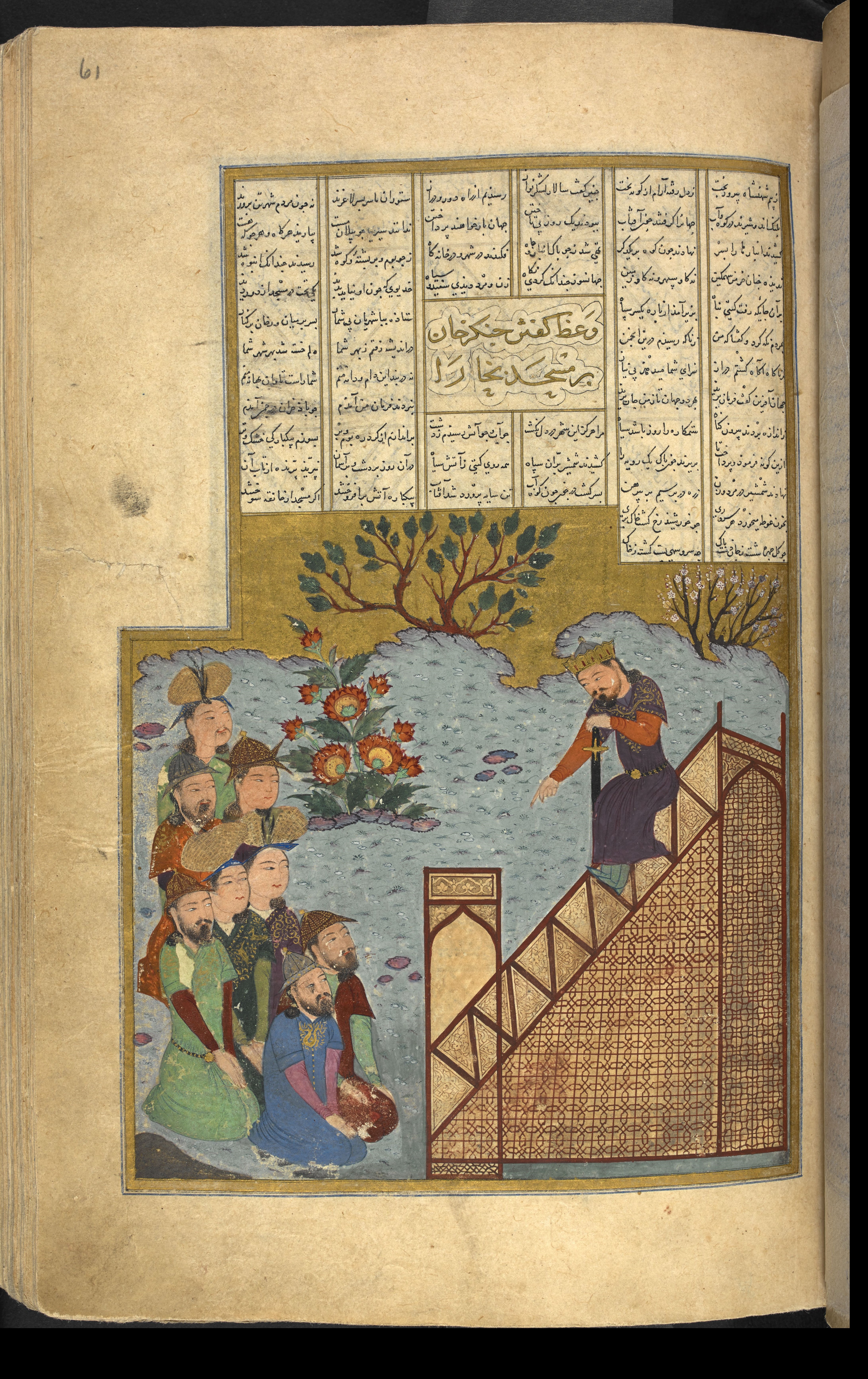
Fourteenth-century depiction of Genghis Khan's speech

Having entered the city, Genghis Khan is recorded to have given a speech at the city's Friday mosque:

O People, know that you have committed great sins, and that the great ones among you have committed these sins. If you ask me what proof I have for these words, I say it is because I am the punishment of God. If you had not committed great sins, God would not have sent a punishment like me upon you.

— Ata-Malik Juvayni, Tarikh-i Jahangushay

The small amount of resistance from the citadel would prove detrimental to the rest of Bukhara. The Mongols set fire to the city in an attempt to flush out the holdouts; since most structures in the city were wooden, the soon-uncontrollable fire reduced most of the city to cinders, including the famed library. Most of the stone structures left standing by the fire were razed by the Mongols, including the Po-i-Kalyan mosque; the Kalyan minaret was left standing.

Although everybody inside the citadel was massacred, the population was not wholly exterminated, unlike other cities such as Merv and Gurganj. Instead, the people were evacuated and divided up. Most women were raped and taken as concubines, and the city's craftsmen were sent to factories and instructed to produce Mongol weaponry, and all remaining men of fighting age were conscripted into the Mongol forces. These conscripts would be used as human shields in the sieges of Samarkand and Gurganj, which would follow in 1220 and 1221. Shah Muhammad died destitute on an island in the Caspian Sea, and the Mongols systematically besieged and took every major city in his empire; his son Jalal al-Din would put up the most resistance but was eventually defeated at the Battle of the Indus in November 1221.

=== Legacy ===
Although devastating in the short-term, the siege was not the city's end. In fact, the city was able to serve as a centre of Asian trade within two decades. Proto-bureaucratic elements were quickly put into place under the auspices of the daruyachi Yelü Ahai. Many of the institutions that were later put into place took inspiration from the Qara-Khitai, which Buell termed 'a prototype Mongol Empire'. Records of a Taoist delegation to the area in 1221 reveal that Samarkand and Bukhara were beginning to be repopulated with Chinese and Khitan artisan settlers; the area was still unstable. A Khwarazmian bandit chief managed to assassinate a Bukharan daruyachi around that time. The former cities of Khwarazmia later became the main sources of income for Ogedai, and would become the key cities of the Chagatai Khanate; Bukhara and Samarkand would later be the home cities of Timur. It regained its religious importance, becoming the most important centre of Sufism in Central Asia and the shrine around the tomb of Sayf al-Din al-Bakharzi one of the most richly endowed properties in the region.
