= Otrar Catastrophe =

1219 siege and capture of Otrar by Mongol Empire

- Part of the Mongol invasion of the Khwarazmian Empire
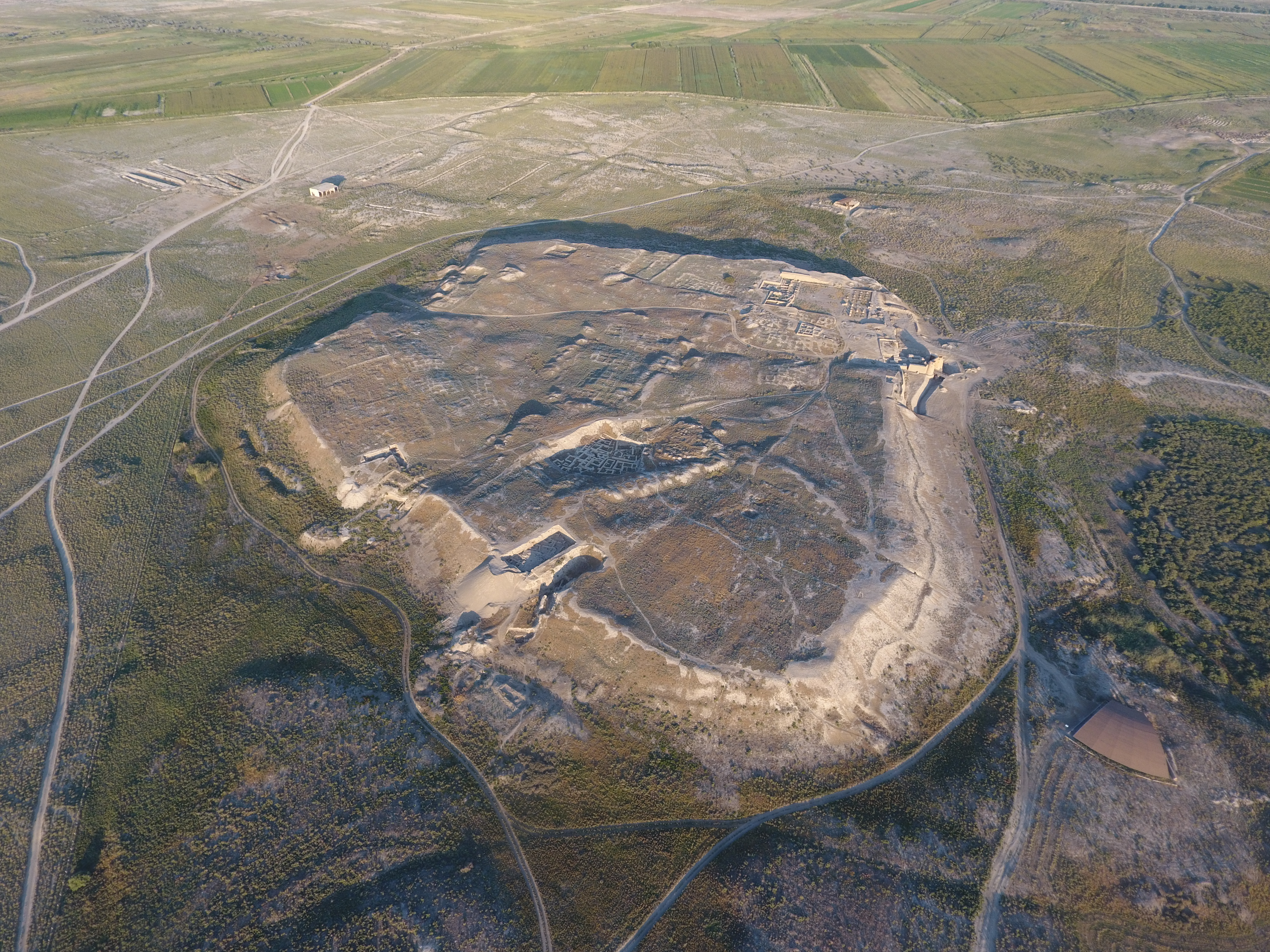
- The remnants of the citadel at Otrar, which was comprehensively destroyed by the Mongols.
Date	December 1219-February 1220
Location	Otrar, present-day Kazakhstan 42°51′N 68°18′E
Result	Mongol victory

Belligerents
Mongol Empire	Khwarazmian Empire

Commanders and leaders
Chagatai; Ogedei; Barchuq Art Tegin	Inalchuq (executed); Qaracha (executed)

Units involved
Horse archers; Siege engines, including gunpowder weapons	City garrison

Strength
50,000–75,000	5,000–15,000

Casualties and losses
Minimal	Extremely high
- Location of the siege on a map of modern Kazakhstan

The Otrar Catastrophe was a siege that took place between December 1219 and February 1220 during the Mongol invasion of the Khwarazmian Empire at Otrar, a large trading city on the Syr Darya river. Inalchuq, the city's governor, had seized the goods of a Mongol trade caravan the previous year; after more provocations from Inalchuq's liege and ruler of the Khwarazmian Empire, Shah Muhammad II, Genghis Khan launched a full-scale invasion of the empire.

The city had been extensively garrisoned and fortified, and the Mongol troops found it difficult to breach the battlements. Progress was slowly made, and by February Genghis felt confident enough to detach part of his army and head southwards towards Transoxiana. His sons Chagatai and Ogedei were left behind to continue the siege. Qaracha, the leading general of the city, deserted in February 1220 and the inner citadel fell soon afterwards. Inalchuq was captured alive, and was executed.

Muhammad had expected the nomadic invaders to fail in capturing Otrar. Its seizure left the Khwarazmian heartland open to conquest—the Mongols would isolate and capture the great cities of Bukhara, Samarkand, and Gurganj in turn. The Otrar oasis would revive as the Syr Darya shifted in its course; the Khwarazmian citadel would remain abandoned.

== Background ==
The Otrar oasis, comprising ten walled towns and fifty smaller villages, covered an area of 200 square kilometres (77 sq mi) near the confluence of the Syr Darya river and its tributary, the Arys; both rivers provided water for an extensive network of irrigation canals. The oasis, which had been inhabited since the second century BC, formed a buffer zone between the nomadic steppe to the north and the sedentary cultures to the south. The eponymous city of Otrar was strongly fortified, being located atop a 20 metres (66 ft) high earthwork called a "tobe". Otrar was also the junction for several major trade routes of the Silk Road, which led westwards to Gurganj and Europe, south to Samarkand and other major cities of Central Asia, and eastwards to China through the Dzungarian Gate.

The city of Otrar is known to have been under the control of a Qarakhanid dynast named Taj ad-Din Bilge-khan in 1204 AD, who as a vassal of the Qara Khitai khanate led an army to assist Muhammad II of Khwarazm against the Ghurids. The Qara Khitai were weakened by events on their eastern frontier: Genghis Khan had begun to establish hegemony over the Mongol tribes, causing great instability in the region. Kuchlug, a Naiman prince who had been defeated by the Mongols, managed to usurp the Qara Khitai throne in 1211, and Muhammad took advantage of the anarchy to greatly expand the Khwarazmian domains. He took possession of the whole of Transoxania and territories as far north as Otrar between 1210 and 1212, and replaced the native governors with his own, exiling Taj ad-Din to Nesa where he was killed.

By 1218, the Khwarazmian Empire controlled most of Central Asia and Persia, and Muhammad was flattered with the title of "Second Alexander". However, Khwarazmian power was tenuous. His empire was vast and newly formed, with a still-developing administration. In addition, his mother Terken Khatun still wielded substantial power in the realm - the historian Peter Golden termed the relationship between the Shah and his mother as "an uneasy diarchy", which often acted to Muhammad's disadvantage. The Soviet historian Ziya Buniyatov noted that Muhammad's decrees were frequently invalidated by Terken Khatun, while she effectively appropriated the Khwarazmian capital of Gurganj as her own domain, forcing Muhammad to take his court to Samarkand. The Khatun, originally a tribal princess of the Kipchaks, manipulated the succession, discrediting the claim of Muhammad's oldest son Jalal al-Din in favour of his half-brother Uzlagh, who was half Kipchak. She also placed many of her kinsmen in high positions in the Khwarazmian administration.

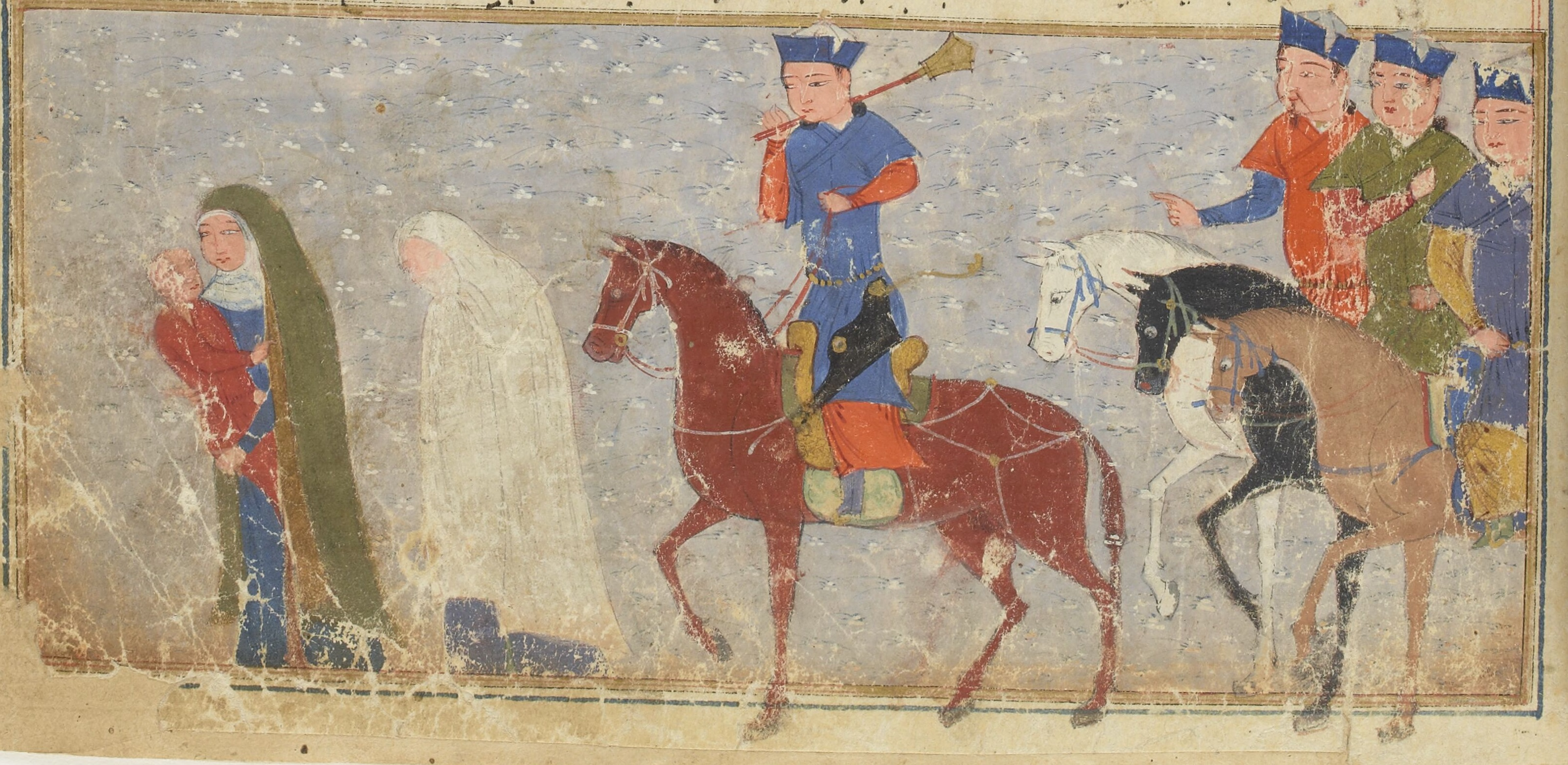
A depiction of Terken Khatun (left) after her later capture by the Mongols.

These promoted kinsmen were strongly disliked by many other Khwarazmian subjects. In addition to their not being Muslim converts, the Kipchaks auxiliaries in Muhammad's army were brutal, avaricious, and often disloyal. It is thus unsurprising that the major accounts of the Mongol invasion of Khwarazmia, all written by Muslim authors, focus blame on Kipchak greed: they specifically mention one of Terken Khatun's nephews, a man named Inalchuq, sometimes titled Gayir Khan or Inal Khan, who was instituted as governor of Otrar, now a frontier town of the Khwarazmian realm.

== Prelude ==
In its capacity as a centre of trade, Otrar received a Mongol trading caravan of 450 merchants in winter 1218-19. These merchants, who brought a large amount of luxury goods such as gold, silver, sable furs, and silk, were followers of Genghis Khan's noyans (close companions). Inalchuq accused them of espionage and had them killed, appropriating their goods for himself. There has been debate on both the involvement of Shah Muhammad and the validity of this accusation. While some chroniclers, such as al-Nasawi attribute blame solely to Inalchuq's greed, most others state that Muhammad either allowed or explicitly ordered the massacre. Paul Ratchnevsky notes that Inalchuq must have at least had "tacit agreement" from Muhammad to carry out such a taboo diplomatic action. It is likely that the charge of espionage was somewhat accurate: both the Khwarazmians and Mongols were known to use merchants and diplomats, who would learn valuable strategic information and spread favourable propaganda as part of their missions, as spies.

The execution of the merchants at Otrar served as a casus belli for two reasons. Firstly, envoys of any kind were considered inviolate in Mongol law, and any slight done to them demanded reparations or vengeance. Muhammad's subsequent humiliation of the Mongol envoys sent to repair relations did not help matters. Secondly, the massacre served as the opening of economic warfare. The steppe nomads had always been greatly concerned with the sanctity and security of trade routes: as the Khwarazmians controlled all the routes beyond Otrar, the Mongols were now completely cut off from trading partners in the Near East. Furthermore, Kuchlug's usurpation of the Qara Khitai and subsequent actions had created religious and territorial tensions in Turkestan.

After all his diplomatic overtures were rebuffed, Genghis Khan prepared for war. He left his general Muqali as viceroy in North China to continue the war against the Jin and gathered the bulk of his army in the Altai Mountains. While early 20th century historians such as Vasily Bartold judged the Mongol invasion force to be between 150,000 and 200,000 men, more recent scholars have produced estimates of between 50,000 and 75,000. Shah Muhammad was reported to have more than 400,000 soldiers, and medieval sources state Otrar housed between 15,000 and 50,000, but these numbers could be exaggerated by a factor of ten. A portion of the city's troops was commanded by Qaracha, a general sent by the Shah to assist Inalchuq.

== Siege ==
The Mongol forces arrived on the Syr Darya in autumn 1219, having forded several rivers and received reinforcements from allies. Genghis' second and third sons, Chagatai and Ogedei, were sent forward to besiege the city, while the Khan himself stayed across the river, laying a trap for the Shah—if he came forward to engage the besieging forces, Genghis would cross the river and annihilate the Khwarazmian army in pitched battle. Shah Muhammad did not take the bait, so Genghis changed plans. As the siege of Otrar was proving lengthy, he split his forces. The Khan's firstborn Jochi was sent northwards to capture cities along the Syr Darya, while the top generals Subutai and Jebe were sent southwards into the Fergana Valley with a small force. Genghis himself took his youngest son Tolui and, aided by local guides, disappeared into the Kyzyl Kum desert to launch a surprise attack on Bukhara.
