= Irghiz River skirmish =

Skirmish between Mongol and Khwarazmian forces at uncertain date

- Part of the Mongol conquest of the Khwarazmian Empire
Date	Uncertain (either 1209 or 1219)
Location	On the Irghiz River (modern-day Aktobe Region, Kazakhstan)
Result	Indecisive

Belligerents
Khwarazmian Empire	Mongol Empire

Commanders and leaders
Muhammed II; Jalal al-Din Mangburni (possibly)	Subutai; Jochi (possibly); Jebe (possibly)

Strength
Between 6,000 and 60,000	Between 14,000 and 40,000

The Irghiz River skirmish was a minor engagement fought between forces of the Khwarazmian Empire and the Mongol Empire during the early 13th century. While the occurrence of the skirmish itself is well-attested, its precise dating is uncertain, since the major chroniclers of the period give differing accounts. Modern historians have proposed two possible dates: 1209 or 1219. The background events are similar for each possible date: Genghis Khan, khagan of the Mongols, sent an army under his general Subutai to attack hostile forces (either a Merkit confederation or the renegade Naiman prince Kuchlug) in the former lands of the Qara-Khitai dynasty. Shah Muhammad, the ruler of the Khwarazmian Empire, received news of large armies operating along his northern borders and set out to confront them.

The Mongol army, which possibly also included the general Jebe and Genghis' eldest son Jochi, was surprised by the Shah very soon after defeating their initial target; Muhammad rejected peace overtures and initiated battle. The fierce engagement, between two armies of approximately equal strength, lasted until nightfall, but the Mongols probably had the upper hand. However, since they had been instructed to avoid any possible fighting, they abandoned their camp in secret during the night. The prowess of the Mongol soldiers displayed during the skirmish has been cited as a major reason for the Shah choosing a defensive strategy during the open warfare of 1220–21, for which this was a preliminary encounter.

== Chronology ==
The skirmish is described in varying levels of detail by four separate chroniclers, who all attest to different dates. The Arab historian Ibn al-Athir maintains that it took place after the execution of a caravan at Otrar in 1218. al-Athir's near-contemporary Nasawi explicitly corrects him by attesting that the battle took place in the year 612 of the Islamic calendar, or 1215–6. The later Persian historian Juzjani gives the date of 615 (1218); while Juvayni records that the Shah departed on his campaign at the end of 1218, giving a date of 1219 for the battle itself. Adding to the confusion, all the chronicles contain errors of differing magnitude: for example, Nasawi indicates that the battle came after the defeat of Kuchlug, which is known to have happened no earlier than 1218; by contrast, Juvayni's account states that the Sultan remained in Bukhara from 30 October to 30 December "because it was springtime" — a contradiction in itself. The later historian Rashid al-Din also provides an account of the Mongol engagements with the Merkit tribes in his Jami' al-tawarikh; however, his chronology of Mongol interactions with the Khwarazmids is suspect because his chronicle misses out years.

The Khwarazmian Empire in 1215 AD. The Irghiz river, the site of the battle, is located on the Khwarazmian border, north of the Aral Sea.

Some historians propose that the battle took place in 1209. Drawing upon sources such as the Secret History of the Mongols and extant biographies of the general Subutai and citing similarities between different campaigns in Juvayni's account, they suggest that the skirmish took place just after Subutai had defeated a Merkit confederation. Because Kuchlug, then a vassal of the Qara-Khitai, managed to seize the key city of Samarkand in 1210, Paul Buell postulates that the indecisive result at the Irghiz River weakened Muhammad's reputation and made the otherwise inexplicable loss of Samarkand possible. According to Christopher Atwood, it is certain that both the Shah and the Mongols were campaigning in the drainage area of the Syr Darya in 1209/10, which lends this account credence in geographical terms; it is however supported by fewer sources than the other version.

Other historians suggest that the battle took place in 1218/19, following the accounts set down by al-Athir and Juvayni: this version emphasises the deterioration in relations between Shah Muhammad and Genghis Khan. Jochi is present in this version. It is recorded that Genghis Khan praised Jochi's leadership on his return from this campaign; historians have assumed that a large battle against a high-quality enemy such as the Shah would be more worthy of high praise than the more routine elimination of the Merkits. Carl Sverdrup suggests that the Shah, who already knew that his provocative diplomatic behaviour would result in a retaliatory Mongol strike, seized the opportunity to weaken both the Merkit raiders and his future Mongol enemies. This is supported by a passage in Juvayni, who records that the Shah wished "to kill two birds with one stone", implying that he had already decided on open hostilities. However, there are logistical difficulties with this account — namely that Jebe was near Wakhan in modern Afghanistan when the disgraced Kuchlug was killed in late 1218, but the Irghiz River flows nearly a thousand miles away in modern Kazakhstan.

== Battle ==
Regardless of the year, it is certain that the Shah, having received news of large armies operating near his borders, assembled a force of his own and rode to meet them. Juvayni records that he reached the Irghiz river the day after the Mongols had defeated their tribal enemies, catching them off their guard; he indicates that the Mongols, who had been instructed by Genghis not to engage any local forces, tried to exchange plunder for safe passage. Muhammad refused and forced a battle by overrunning the Mongol camp.

The precise size of each force is highly disputed, not least because it varies depending on the selected chronology. Chroniclers such as Nasawi place the Sultan's force at 60,000 and the Mongol force at 20,000. Leo De Hartog has proposed that Jebe was not present at the battle but maintains the Mongol figure of 20,000. Sverdrup has proposed much lower totals of between five and fifteen thousand soldiers on each side. He theorizes that the Khwarazmian forces were slightly stronger than the Mongols and may in fact have been outnumbered.

The dispositions of each force also depend on the selected chronology. While in both versions, the two overall commanders are the Shah and Subutai, in the 1219 version Jalal al-Din and Jochi would have commanded their respective right wings, with Jebe, if present, on the left. When joined, the battle was fairly even, but both right flanks succeeded in pushing back their respective opponents. It is clear from both Juvayni and Nasawi that the Shah was left momentarily isolated in the centre; however, a cavalry charge from his right wing, possibly led by his son Jalal al-Din, managed to force the enemy back. Subutai's biography in the Yuán Shǐn records that "Jebe fought an unsuccessful engagement".

The indecisive engagement was stopped by the onset of night. The Shah believed that fighting would resume the next day but found at dawn that the Mongols had abandoned their camp and headed homewards; the Mongols had kindled fires and torches to give the impression their camp was still occupied. The otherwise unimportant skirmish gained greater importance as the first clash between Mongol and Khwarazmian forces before the Mongol invasion in 1219. The Khwarazmian ruler is reported to have been shaken and even scared by the strength and valour of the Mongol forces; many historians, following Vasily Bartold, cite this reaction as the reason he chose a purely defensive strategy during the invasion.
