= Siege of Gurganj =

1221 Mongol siege

Siege of Gurganj (1220)
- Part of the Mongol invasion of the Khwarazmian Empire
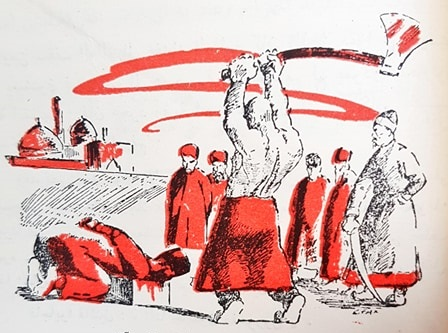
- A depiction of an execution following the siege
Date	October 1220-April 1221
Location	Gurganj, present-day Turkmenistan 42°19′N 59°11′E
Result	Mongol victory

Belligerents
Mongol Empire	Khwarazmian Empire

Commanders and leaders
Ogedei Khan; Chagatai Khan; Jochi	Unknown

Units involved
Horse archers; Auxiliaries, and engineers; Siege engines, including Chinese gunpowder weapons	City garrison

Strength
Unknown	Unknown

Casualties and losses
Unknown	Heavy
- Location of the siege on a map of modern Turkmenistan

The siege of Gurganj occurred during the Mongol invasion of the Khwarazmian Empire. The siege's length is variable, with historians such as Rashid al-Din Hamadani stating that it lasted for seven months, but it is largely agreed that it ended with the defeat and annihilation of the city in April 1221. Genghis Khan, ruler of the Mongol Empire, had launched a multi-pronged assault on the Turkic Khwarazmian Empire, ruled by Shah Muhammad II. Through a combination of efficient planning and excellent manoeuvering, the Khan's army managed to take the border town of Otrar swiftly, followed by the large cities of Bukhara and Samarkand. The siege, among others, was witnessed by the Persian biographer Shihab al-Din Muhammad al-Nasawi, who recorded an account in Arabic c. 1241.

Genghis sent a detachment, led by his sons Jochi and Chagatai, northwest to lay siege to the former capital of Gurganj. Immensely wealthy, the city lay on marshy grounds on the delta of the Amu Darya, making it difficult to assault. Adapting to the lack of stones to use as projectiles, the Mongols cut down huge groves of mulberry trees, soaked the trunks in water to harden them, and used them as battering rams and catapult projectiles.

The siege was complicated by disagreements between the two commanding brothers. Eventually, Genghis sent Ogedai, his third son and eventual heir, as sole commander for the siege.

When the city was eventually taken, it was annihilated, in one of the bloodiest massacres in human history. In the final assault on the city walls, thousands of civilians were herded together by the Mongols and pushed into the city's moats. The corpses eventually filled the moats, upon which a ramp was built to attack the walls.

The Mongols destroyed the dams on the Oxus River, flooding the city. They enslaved the women, children, and the city's artisans, totaling to around 100,000 people and killed the remaining population. The dams were never repaired, possibly because no one alive knew how to repair them, and the Oxus then flowed into the Caspian Sea for the next 300 years.

After the destruction of Gurganj, the Mongols established the nearby city of Ürgenč, which quickly became a flourishing commercial centre.

== See also ==
- Gurgānj Dam
- Otrar Catastrophe
