= Inalchuq =

Khwarazmian governor

Inalchuq (or Inalchuk) (died 1219) was governor of Otrar in the Khwarezmian Empire in the early 13th century, known mainly for helping to provoke the successful and catastrophic invasion of Khwarezmia by Genghis Khan.

Inalchuq was an uncle of Sultan Muhammad II of Khwarezmia. His name meant "little Inal" in his native Turkic, and he held the title Ghayir-Khan.

== History ==
=== Slaughter of Mongolian trade caravan ===
In 1218, a Mongolian trade caravan of around 450 men arrived in Otrar, including an ambassador from Genghis Khan. Inalchuq accused them of being Mongolian spies and arrested them. There may in fact have been spies in the caravan; however, Inalchuq may have also been provoked by having been called Inalchuq rather than the less familiar Ghayir-Khan by one of the members of the caravan, or he may have simply wanted a pretext to seize the caravan's riches. With the assent of Sultan Muhammad, he executed the entire caravan, and its goods were sold in Bukhara. A camel driver escaped this massacre and reported back to Genghis Khan, who responded by sending a delegation of one Muslim and two Mongol diplomats to Sultan Muhammad, demanding that Inalchuq be punished. Muhammad responded by beheading the Muslim ambassador and shaving off the beards of his two Mongol companions, provoking Genghis Khan's retaliatory invasion.

Genghis Khan besieged Otrar in 1219, as one of the first major cities to be attacked. Inalchuq was in charge of the garrison (an exaggerated 20,000–60,000 men according to pro-Mongol historians). Unlike most of the other cities—which either felt no loyalty to the Shah and surrendered with little to no fighting or sallied out with outnumbered forces to be destroyed by the Mongols in the field—Otrar's garrison remained on their walls and stubbornly resisted the Mongol attacks for over five months. The city only fell when a traitor within the walls (a sub-commander named Qaracha) opened the gates to the besiegers and defected with part of his army; he and his men were slaughtered by the Mongols regardless, who said they would not trust traitors to serve them.

=== Capture and execution ===
The Mongols entered the city and slaughtered most of Inalchuq's unprepared garrison at night. Following this, Inalchuq barricaded himself in Otrar's inner citadel with the remnants of his troops (reportedly 1/10 of the garrison), managing to hold out for another month and inflict heavy casualties against further Mongol attacks. Eventually, he was trapped with his last two remaining bodyguards on the upper floors of the citadel; the Mongols desired to capture him alive to execute him. Inalchuq and his guards resorted to throwing bricks down on the Mongols, reportedly slaying many of them. Finally the governor's guards were killed and he was captured. Inalchuq was reportedly executed by molten silver being poured into his eyes and ears, though this may be apocryphal.
