= Shihab al-Din Muhammad al-Nasawi =

Secretary and biographer of the Khwarazmshah Jalal al-Din Mangburni

Shihab al-Din Muhammad al-Nasawi (Persian: شهاب الدین محمد النساوی; died c. 1250) was a Persian secretary and biographer of the Khwarazmshah Jalal al-Din Mangburni (r. 1220–1231). Born in Nasa in Khorasan, he witnessed first-hand the Mongol invasion of Khorasan and Jalal ad-Din's subsequent flight and military adventures of which he left an account written in Arabic c. 1241. He had beforehand written another work, the Nafthat al-masdur, an account of his life prior to 1231, written in Persian c. 1234/5.

== Sources ==
- Jackson, P. (1993). "al-Nasawī". In Bosworth, C. E.; van Donzel, E.; Heinrichs, W. P. & Pellat, Ch. (eds.). The Encyclopaedia of Islam, Second Edition. Volume VII: Mif–Naz. Leiden: E. J. Brill. pp. 973–974. ISBN 978-90-04-09419-2.
- Jackson, Peter (2017). The Mongols and the Islamic World: From Conquest to Conversion. Yale University Press. ISBN 9780300227284. JSTOR 10.3366/j.ctt1n2tvq0. (registration required)
- Manz, Beatrice Forbes (2020). "Iranian Elites under the Timurids". In Steenbergen, Jo Van (ed.). Trajectories of State Formation across Fifteenth-Century Islamic West-Asia. Brill. pp. 257–282. ISBN 978-9004431300.
