= Otrar =

Otrar Отырар (Kazakh)
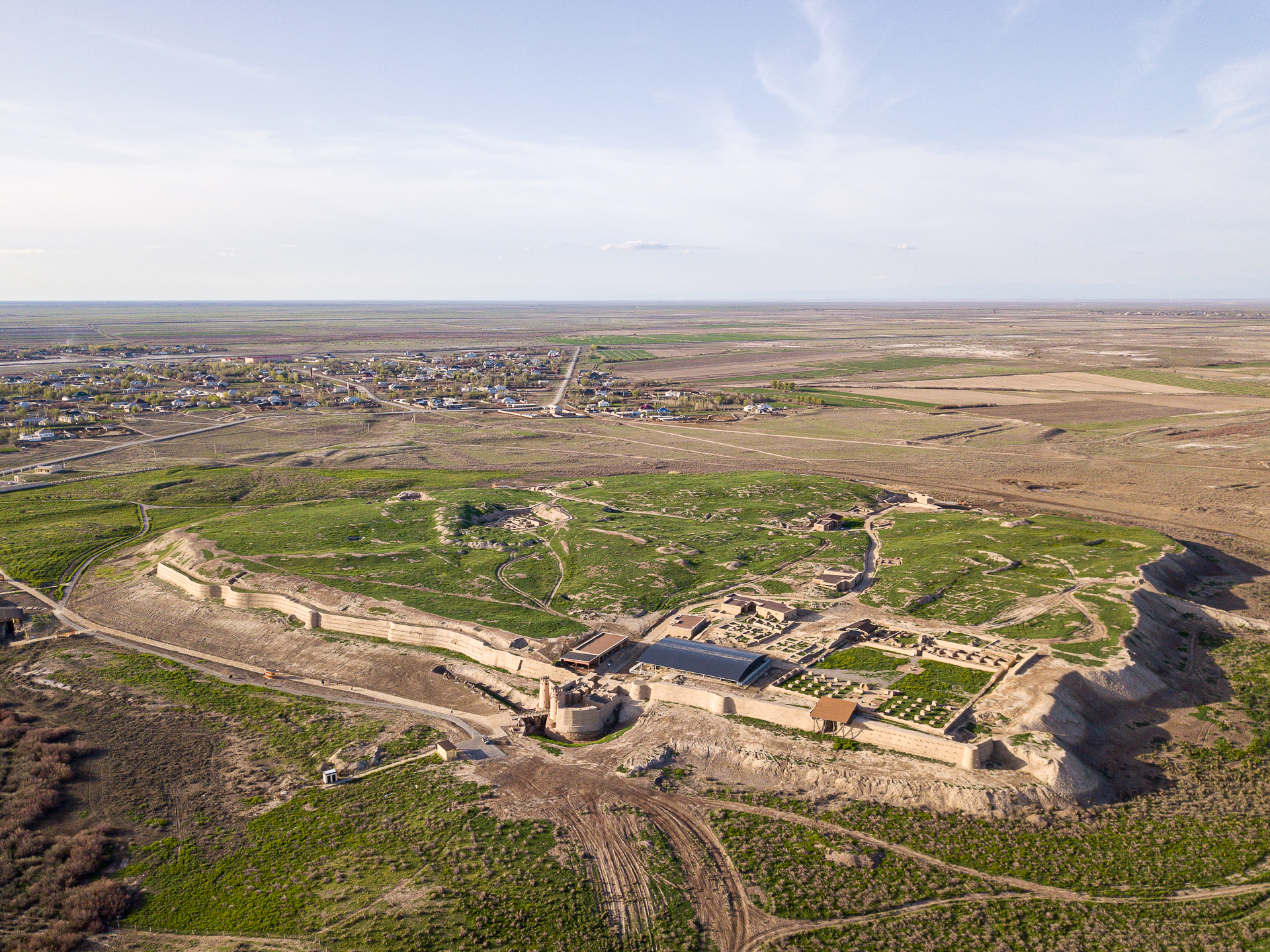
- Aerial view of Otrar hillfort

- Location in Kazakhstan Otrar (Kazakhstan)
- Coordinates: 42°51′09″N 68°18′10″E
- Country: Kazakhstan
- Province: Turkestan Region
- Founded: before 8th century
- Elevation: 506 m (1,660 ft)
- Time zone: UTC+6 (ALMT)
- Postal code: 160000

Otrar or Otyrar (Kazakh: Отырар [wotɤ̥ˈrɑr]; Old Turkic: 𐰚𐰭𐰇:𐱃𐰺𐰢𐰣, romanized: Keŋü Tarman), also called Farab, is an ancient city in southern Kazakhstan which was located on the Silk Road. It was an important city in the history of Central Asia, situated on the borders of settled and agricultural civilizations. It was the center of a great oasis and political district, commanding a key point connecting Kazakhstan with China, Europe, the Middle East, Siberia and Ural.

== Names ==
The first known state in the region was known to Chinese scholars as Kangju, which was centered on the Syr Darya (also known as the Kang River). Kangju existed from the 1st century BC until the 5th century AD. Its capital was reportedly at or near Bityan. After being subject to several different waves of invaders, Kangju collapsed into several independent states situated mainly in the Syr Darya valley and its tributaries of Keles and Atysi.

There are records that portray the determination of earlier names of Farab. It is thought that a group of coins collected in Otrar and some towns of the oasis date back to the time of these records. There is a generic symbol of the Turgeshi in the form of a bow on the obverse of such coins and the image of a lion on the reverse side. On a second type of coin, there is an "X" sign on the reverse side; these may originate from the mint of a local ruler. There is a suggestion that the coins of the second type were minted by rulers of the Turkic state of Kangu Tarban, the population of which were the Kangars. According to the coins, in the 6th to 8th centuries, Kangu Tarban was ruled by a local dynasty of the Kangars, and their capital became a Tarban town named Turarband that was later to be called Otrar. Since the times of the golden hordes, the ruins of Otrar have been attractive because of rumours about the treasures of the ancient rulers, and about buried piles of gold coins and jewelry. The source of such legends was perhaps confirmed by the archaeological finds of various coins and jewelry.

In the 9th to the 10th centuries, various sources refer to Otrar as one of the Ispidjab towns. This is probably related to the fact that the city first submitted to the Caliphate and then to the Samanids. As before, Otrar remained the center of the district which occupied a space of "about one day's journey in all directions", which is many times mentioned by the chroniclers. The town is also known to have minted its own coinage.

== Location ==
The Syr Darya played a unique role in the life of Otrar and the whole region, and its waters were used for irrigation. They were also known for being abundant with fish and its shores were covered with rich vegetation and were also home to many birds and animals. Otrar is mentioned in numerous sources such as medieval Arab, Persian and Turkic authors. These sources refer to it as one of the Zhetysu (Seven Rivers) towns. The town was situated at the junction of different geographical landscapes and was at the intersection of the caravan routes of the Great Silk Road. Otrar, being at the junction of the two great rivers, was the center of the large agricultural region and, being near the foothills of the Karatau Mountains, became one of the supporting fortresses of the nomads wandering in the steppes. From Otrar, along the Arys, roads spread out to Taraz, Balasagun, and further on to Xinjiang; along the Syr Darya an old road went up to Shash, Sogd, and then to Merv and Nishapur, and another road went down to the Aral Sea and the Ural. Another well known road ran through the Kyzylkum desert moving westward to Khorezm and on to the Volga region, the Black Sea and the Caucasus.

The oasis of Otrar is situated in the Kyzylkum district of the South Kazakhstan Province. It is 120 km northwest of Shymkent and 50 km from Turkistan. The disasters and wars that passed over the town have done their part. Now, at the site of the once-prosperous town, there remain only ruins overgrown with grass. A person who first comes to the Otrar oasis is often surprised by the appearance of the numerous stark ruins of towns and settlements, castles and watchtowers. The main irrigation channels are now crossed with dried fields and their cracked beds have not held water for centuries.

The oasis of Otrar is not one single site, but rather it is a large oasis containing a series of towns and cities. Each hill formed in the place of ancient settlements has, at present its own name: Altyntobe, Dzhalpak-tobe, Kuyuk-Mardan-tobe and Pchakchi-tobe. In earlier times, they had different names that are now forgotten and only the names of the three towns known in manuscript sources may be identified at the present ruins.

== History ==
The city has a history dating back to the time of the Achaemenid Empire, when it was known as Parab. The older Persian Pārāb (in Ḥudūd al-ʿĀlam) or Fārāb (also Fāryāb and Pāryāb), is a common Persian toponym meaning "lands irrigated by diversion of river water". (Fāryāb) also is the name of a province in northern Afghanistan. By the 13th century, Fārāb on the Jaxartes was known as Otrār.

=== Mongols and Timurids ===
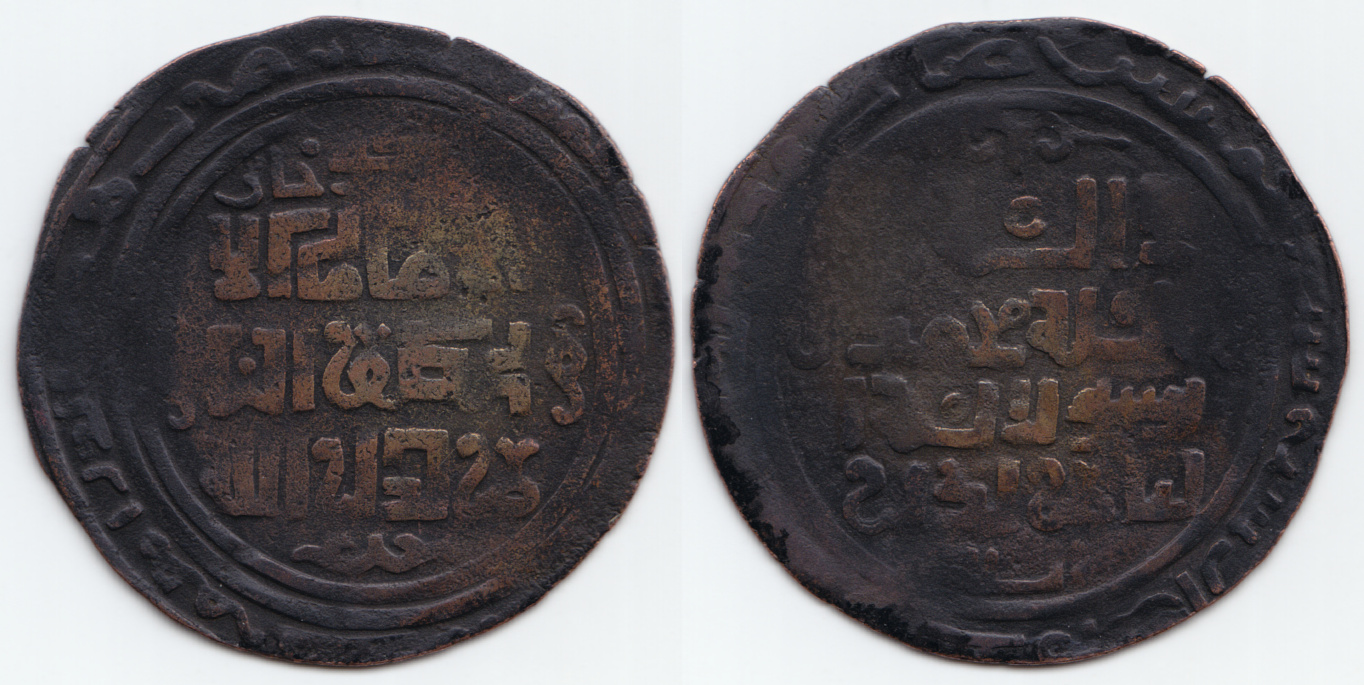
Copper dirham minted in Otrar in 1258–1259, during the reign of Möngke Khan.

The prosperity of Otrar was interrupted by the Mongol invasion of Central Asia.

In 1218, a Mongolian trade caravan of around 450 men arrived in Otrar, including an ambassador of Genghis Khan. The governor of Otrar, Inalchuq, who was an uncle of Sultan Muhammad II of the Khwarazmian Empire accused them of being Mongolian spies and arrested them, and with the assent of Sultan Muhammed, executed the entire caravan.

Genghis Khan responded by sending a delegation of three diplomats to Sultan Muhammad, demanding Inalchuq be punished; but Muhammad responded by beheading the Muslim ambassador and shaving off the beards of his two Mongol companions, provoking Genghis Khan into a retaliatory invasion. He besieged Otrar for five months in 1219, eventually breaching its walls and executing Inalchuq along with massacring the inhabitants.

Many of the towns in the oasis never recovered and were abandoned. However, Otrar city rose again and during the troubled years of civil wars, which followed Genghis Khan's death, the town again became an important political and economic center. By the middle of the 13th century, it had returned as a large trade center on the way from the West to the East. During the second half of the 14th century Southern Kazakhstan was brought into the sphere of Timur's power. In February 1405, when Timur was visiting Otrar to gather his troops, he caught a cold and died in one of the Otrar palaces.

=== Uzbeks, Kazakhs, and Dzungars ===
The death of Timur led to more struggles, which resulted in Abu'l-Khayr Khan conquering several tribes and placing himself at the head of a new Uzbek Khanate. Other descendants of Genghis Khan had claims over the area as well, and so for most of the 16th and 17th centuries there was non-stop feuding among these various parties for power over the Kazakh Steppe and the Syr Darya valley, especially between the Kazakh Khanate and Dzungar feudal lords. Even so, a degree of stability was maintained in Otrar up until the Dzungars attempted and failed to conquer southern Kazakhstan.

These followed a prolonged period of revolt, which resulted in the economic decline of the area and its towns. As the Eurasian arm of the Silk Road gradually lost its importance, so did the city. Through the 17th and 18th centuries, the irrigation system slowly fell out of use, and the lower part of the Temir-Aryk dried out.

By the end of the 18th century, there were only 40 families remaining in Otrar, compared to perhaps 5,000–7,000 in the 14th to 17th centuries, and the irrigated area had declined to about 5 square kilometres.^{[1]}

== Archaeological findings ==
The area of the settlement is about 2 square kilometres. The lowest layers of the settlement are dated from the 1st century AD and the earliest monuments are dated from the 12th to 15th centuries. Otrar was a typical fortress for Central Asia. The Ark (central fortress) and Shahristan (fortified city) formed a five-corner hill about 18 meters of height. The area of the hill is 200,000 square metres. Excavations proved that it was an advanced town with monumental buildings. The town was densely populated: the houses stood close to each and formed the group of quarters or blocks. Two bath houses, dated by 9th to the 12th centuries, were found on the rabat (suburbs) outside the city wall. The baths had central halls for bathing and massaging, rooms for undressing, restrooms and a prayer room. They had hot water supply systems. Dishes excavated near two furnaces help prove that Otrar was the center of ceramic production in Central Asia. The ceramics had elements of decoration. One of the greatest artifacts was the figure of water carrier – a camel with a woman's head and cradle on its back.
