= Zayn al-Din Gorgani =

12th-century Persian physician

Sayyid Zayn al-Din Isma'il al-Husayni al-Jurjani (Ismail Gorgani)
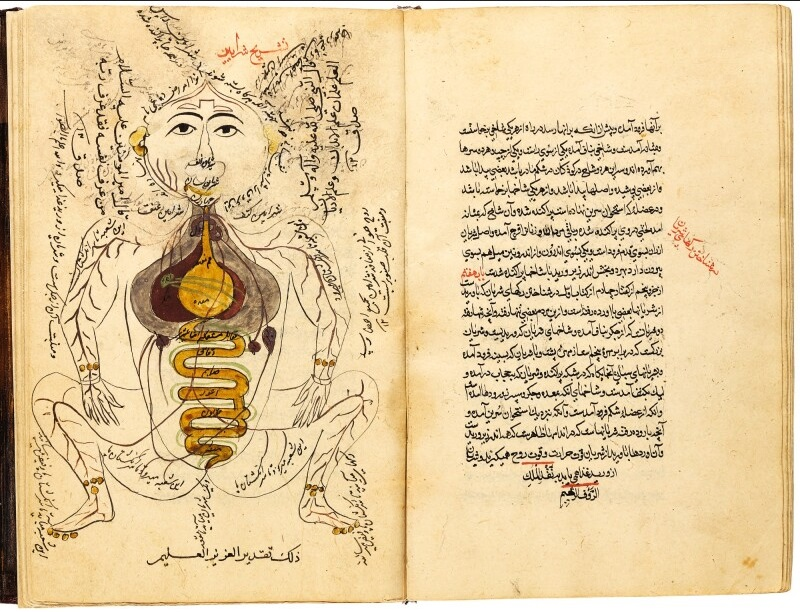
- Manuscript of Jurjani's Tashrih Zakhirah-i Khwarazmshahi, vol. I (on anatomy). Copy created in Safavid Iran, dated 1663

Personal life
- Born: c. 1040 Gorgan, Iran
- Died: c. 1136 (aged 94–95) Khwarazm
- Era: Islamic golden age
- Main interest(s): Traditional medicine, Theology, Philosophy and Ethics
- Notable work(s): Zakhireye Khwarazmshahi and many others

Religious life
- Religion: Islam

Muslim leader
- Influenced by: Avicenna, Ibn Abi Sadiq

Zayn al-Din Sayyed Isma‘il ibn Husayn Gorgani (c. 1040–1136), also spelled al-Jurjani, was a Persian 12th century royal Islamic physician from Gorgan, Iran. In addition to medical and pharmaceutical sciences, he was also an adept in theological, philosophic, and ethical sciences. Jurjani was a pupil of Ibn Abi Sadiq and Ahmad ibn Farrokh. He arrived at the court in the Persian province of Khwarazm in the year 1110 when he was already a septuagenarian. There he became a court physician to the governor of the province, Khwarazm-Shah Qutb al-Din Muhammad I, who ruled from 1097 to 1127. It was to him that he dedicated his most comprehensive and influential work, the Persian-language compendium Zakhirah-i Khvarazm'Shahi.

Jurjani continued as court physician to Khwarazm'Shah Qutb al-Din's son and successor, Ala al-Din Atsiz, until at some unspecified time he moved to the city of Merv, the capital of the rival Seljuq Sultan Sanjar (ruled 1118–1157), where he died nearly at 100 lunar years of age.

Jurjani composed a number of important medical and philosophical treatises, in both Persian and Arabic, most of them written after he moved to Khwarazm at the age of 70 lunar years.

== Thesaurus of the Shah of Khwarazm ==
Al-Jurjani wrote the Persian medical encyclopedia, Thesaurus of the Shah of Khwarazm (also known as The Treasure of Khwarazm Shah), sometime after 1110, when he moved to the northern Persian province of Khwarezm. Much of his work was dependent on Avicenna's The Canon of Medicine (c. 1025), along with al-Jurjani's own ideas not found in the Canon. The work is composed of ten volumes covering ten medical fields: anatomy, physiology, hygiene, diagnosis and prognosis, fevers, diseases particular to a part of the body, surgery, skin diseases, poisons and antidotes, and medicaments (both simple and compound). In endocrinology, in particular, al-Jurjani was one of "the first to associate exophthalmos with goitre," which was not repeated until Caleb Parry (1755–1822) in 1825, and later by Robert James Graves (1796–1853) and Carl von Basedow (1799–1854). Al-Jurjani also established an association between goitre and palpitation.

On "Drugs recommended for lice control," Gorgani recommends the following method:

A) Keeping oneself clean

B) Wearing Cotton and Silk Clothing

C) Changing them Frequently

D) Using anointments composed of the following drugs which work as desiccating agents: 1) Fruits of sumac with Olive Oil. 2) leaves and roots of Rumex 3) Alum (vitriol) with olive oil. 4) leaves of Melia azedarach. 5) leaves of pomegranate; 6) leaves of colocynth 7) leaves of myrtle 8) leaves of Thymus Serpyllum 9) leaves of flax [Linum Usitatissimum] 10) leaves of Acorus Calamus] 11) leaves of Acorus Calamus and finally 12) Cinnamon with olive oil, specially with the oil of Cathamus Tinctorius and oil radish.

Most of the above botanicals have recently been shown to possess especially insecticidal properties.

== Works ==
Some of his works are:

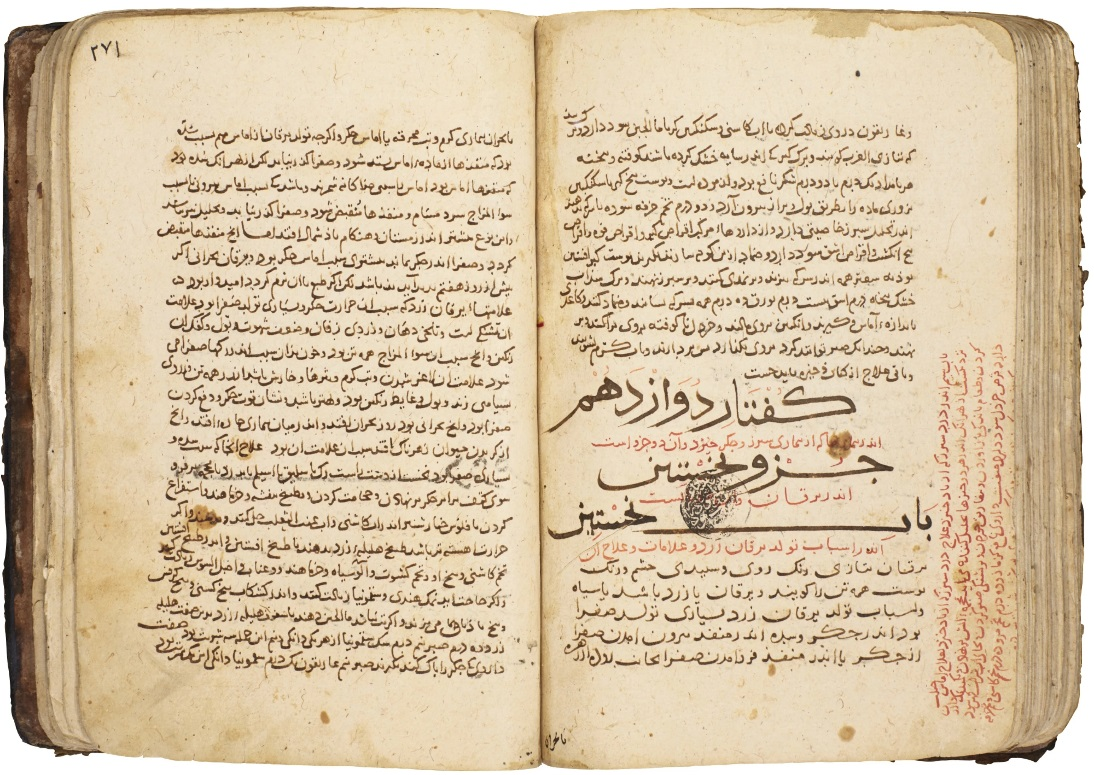
Persian manuscript of Jurjani's al-Aghradh al-tibbiyah wa'l-mabahith al-‘ala’iyah. Copy created in Ilkhanid Iran, dated late 13th century/early 14th century

1. Zakhireh-i Kharazmshahi, a ten volume encyclopedia of medical sciences
2. Khafi Alayee, a summary of Zakhireh-i Kharazmshahi
3. Al-Iqraz al-Tebbieh and Al-Mabahis al-Alaieh,
4. Tib Yadegar
5. Kitab-fi-Hifz al-Sihat (Book on Preserving Health)
6. Book on Anatomy
7. Zubdah al-Tib, a discussion of medicine and pharmacology (Arabic)
8. Al tazkereh al-Ashrafyeh fi Asnaah al-Tebbieh, an Arabic translation of Khafi Alayee
9. Al-Tib al-Mulkuki
10. Kitab al-Manbah or Al-Risalah al-Manbah, a book on ethics and resisting desires and passions,
11. Kitab Tadbir al-Yaum va Laylah, a book on ethics and morality,
12. Kitab Nameh, about ethics
13. Fi al-Qias, a philosophical work
14. Fi al-Tahlil, another philosophical work
15. Al-Zakhireh al-Kharazmshahieh, a translation of Zakhireh-i Kharazmshahi into Arabic
16. Al-Kazemieh, a philosophical treatise
17. Al-Javiah al-Tebbiah va al Mabahes al-alaiyeh, (authorship disputed)
18. Kitab fi al-Rad al-Phalasifah

== See also ==
- List of Iranian scientists

== Sources ==
- Gignoux, P. (2015) “Anatomy and Therapy of Eye-Diseases in Esmā῾īl Gorgānī Compared to Syriac Sources,” in Krasnowolska, A. and Rusek-Kowalska, R. (eds) Studies on the Iranian World: Medieval and Modern. Jagiellonian University Press, pp. 341–346.
- B. Thierry de Crussol des Epesse, Discours sur l'oeil d'Esma`il Gorgani (Teheran: Institut Français de Recherche en Iran, 1998), pp. 7–13.
- Lutz Richter-Bernburg, Persian Medical Manuscripts at the University of California, Los Angeles: A Descriptive Catalogue, Humana Civilitas, vol. 4 (Malibu: Udena Publications, 1978). pp. 208
- C.A. Storey, Persian Literature: A Bio-Bibliographical Survey. Volume II, Part 2: E.Medicine (London: Royal Asiatic Society, 1971), pp 207–211 no. 361
- The article "Djurdjani" by J. Schacht in The Encyclopaedia of Islam, 2nd edition, ed. by H.A.R. Gibbs, B. Lewis, Ch. Pellat, C. Bosworth et al., 11 vols. (Leiden: E.J. Brill, 1960–2002) (2nd ed.), vol. 2, p. 603
- The article "Dakira-ye Kvarazmshahi" by `Ali-Akbar Sa`idi Sirjani in Encyclopædia Iranica, ed. Ehsan Yarshater, 6+ vols. (London: Routledge & Kegan Paul and Costa Mesa: Mazda, 1983 to present), vol. 6 (1999) pp. 609–610.
- Shoja MM, Tubbs RS. The history of anatomy in Persia. J Anat 2007; 210:359–378.
- A Research Conducted on the Life and Works of Hakim Sayyid Esmail Jurjani, Mohammad Reza Shams Ardekani, Fariborz Moatar. Journal of the International Society for the History of Islamic Medicine, Vol 4, No 7, April 2005.
