= Khafi Alayee =

The Khofi Alayee was written by Zayn al-Din Gorgani (1040–1136) also spelled al-Jurjani, after writing the first great Persian medical encyclopedia, the Zakhireye Khwarazmshahi also wrote the Khafi Alayee in the Persian language as a contracted form of the Zakhireye Khwarazmshahi. Khofe alaei becomes easier to read than the original Zakhireye Khwarazmshahi. The Khafi Alayee is a pocket book so that a reader can easily carry it in a journey as manual of emergency medicine. Khoffi Alayee, means Alayee Book, because it was dedicated to Alā ud-Dīn Atsiz, - Alayee, the young prince of Khwarazmian dynasty (died 1156).

== Contents ==
The Khoffi Alayee was originally written in two parts so that physicians could put each part in one of his boots while he was on traveling by horse. Therefore, this book is a prototype of what is today called a pocket book. The first part has two articles: the first containing sixteen chapters and the second seven chapters. The second part has seven articles with 23 chapters. The second part is about etiology of diseases, treatment as well as personal hygiene.

Gorgani in the introduction of this book announced that the contents would be the essential practical emergency topics. Gorgani wrote that medical knowledge can be divided into two parts: theoretical knowledge and practical knowledge.

Practical knowledge further divides into branches but the most fundamental is personal hygiene. Gorgani wrote that another important task of the physician is to predict and identify the disease (prognosis), the diagnosis of the patient's condition and course of the disease and the patient's life expectancy. Gorgani wrote that the theoretical science must be evidence based and helps to distinguish the normalities and abnormalities of the patient. Also, if someone was sick, then the duty of physician is to start the medical procedures for treatment of the patient with the: prescribe directives, regulation of nutrition till proper cure. The scientific part of the book itself.

== Linguistic study ==
As a frequently used scientific Persian medical textbook of its own time, the text also has socio-linguistic peculiarities that are attractive for linguistic researchers. For example, in Khofe Alayee in the case of a patient that has mild fever it states "To release patient from temperature, the home must be cooled down and the patient would be worn a dresses which allows the cold air can reach into his lungs, not reach to his body." The word of the home and the patient both are in passive form, but the cold air is active and can reach into his lungs. From the viewpoints of a linguistic researcher the above-mentioned sentence reflects the writers vision and shows how the patient is objectified. The words of the home and the suitable dresses of the patient is a reflection of the socioeconomic situation of the patient. In fact the correct name of this book is "Khofe alaei" because in Arabic language khof means boot and khofe means related to boot. As mentioned above, physicians and other readers would put the books in their boots while traveling so that the books be near their hands (such as pocket book of our time).

== Present day ==
The Late Professor Dr. Mahmoud Najm Abadi, with the cooperation of Dr. Ali Akbar Velayati, edit this book and added explanations and commentaries to it for publication.

== Sources ==
- C.A. Storey, Persian Literature: A Bio-Bibliographical Survey. Volume II, Part 2: E.Medicine (London: Royal Asiatic Society, 1971), pp 207–211 no. 361.
- The article "Djurdjani" by J. Schacht in The Encyclopaedia of Islam, 2nd edition, ed. by H.A.R. Gibbs, B. Lewis, Ch. Pellat, C. Bosworth et al., 11 vols. (Leiden: E.J. Brill, 1960–2002) (2nd ed.), vol. 2, p. 603.
- A Research Conducted on the Life and Works of Hakim Sayyid Esmail Jurjani, Mohammad Reza Shams Ardekani, Fariborz Moatar. Journal of the International Society for the History of Islamic Medicine, Vol 4, No 7, April 2005.
- http://www.elib.hbi.ir/persian/TRADITIONALMEDICINE/JORJANI/JORJANI_KHOFE_ALAEI_EBOOK/JORJANI_KHOFEALAEI1.htm
