= Ekinchi =

Ekinchi may refer to:

- Akinchi / Əkinçi, an Azeri-language newspaper published in 1875–1877
- Ekinchi, shah of Khwarazm
