= Ibn Abi Sadiq =

Persian physician

Commentary on Hippocrates' Aphorisms

Ibn Abi Sadiq al-Naishaburi, Abu al-Qasim ‘Abd al-Rahman ibn ‘Ali (Arabic and Persian: أبوالقاسم عبد الرحمن بن علي بن أبي صادق النيشابوري ) was an 11th-century Persian physician from Nishapur in Khorasan. He was a pupil of Avicenna. As he composed a popular commentary on the Aphorisms of Hippocrates, he was known in some circles as "the second Hippocrates" (Buqrat al-thani). Ismail Gorgani, the author of Zakhireye Khwarazmshahi, completed his studies under his guidance.

His commentary on the Hunayn ibn Ishaq's Questions on Medicine, however, may have been even more popular, judging from the large number of copies preserved today. Ibn Abi Sadiq also wrote a commentary on the Prognostics of Hippocrates, on Galen's treatise On the Usefulness of the Parts, and on Razi's treatise Doubts about Galen (Shukuk ‘alá Jalinus). According to the medieval biographical sources, he completed the commentary on Galen's On the Usefulness of the Parts in the year 1068 AD, which provides us with the one firm date in his biography.

== Sources ==
- The article "Ebn Abi Sadeq" by Lutz Richter-Bernburg in Encyclopædia Iranica, ed. Ehsan Yarshater, 6+ vols. (London: Routledge & Kegan Paul and Costa Mesa: Mazda, 1983 to present), vol. 7, p. 663
- Manfred Ullmann, Die Medizin im Islam, Handbuch der Orientalistik, Abteilung I, Ergänzungsband vi, Abschnitt 1 (Leiden: E.J. Brill, 1970), p 160.
- Carl Brockelmann, Geschichte der arabischen Litteratur, 1st edition, 2 vols. (Leiden: Brill, 1889–1936). Second edition, 2 vols. (Leiden: Brill, 1943–49). Page references will be to those of the first edition, with the 2nd edition page numbers given in parentheses, vol. 1, p. 484 (638), Carl Brockelmann, Geschichte der arabischen Litteratur, Supplement, 3 vols. (Leiden: Brill, 1937–1942). vol. 1, pp. 886–7
- Lutz Richter-Bernburg, Iran's Contribution to Medicine and Veterinary Science in Islam AD 100-900/AD 700-1500", in The Diffusion of Greco-Roman Medicine in the Middle East and the Caucasus, ed. J.A.C. Greppin, E. Savage-Smith, and J.L. Gueriguian (Delmar, New York: Caravan Press, 1999).

== See also ==
- List of Iranian scientists
