= Khwarazmian Empire =

Medieval Muslim empire (c. 1077–1231)

Khwarazmian Empire خوارزمشاهیان Khwārazmshāhiyān
- c. 1077–1231
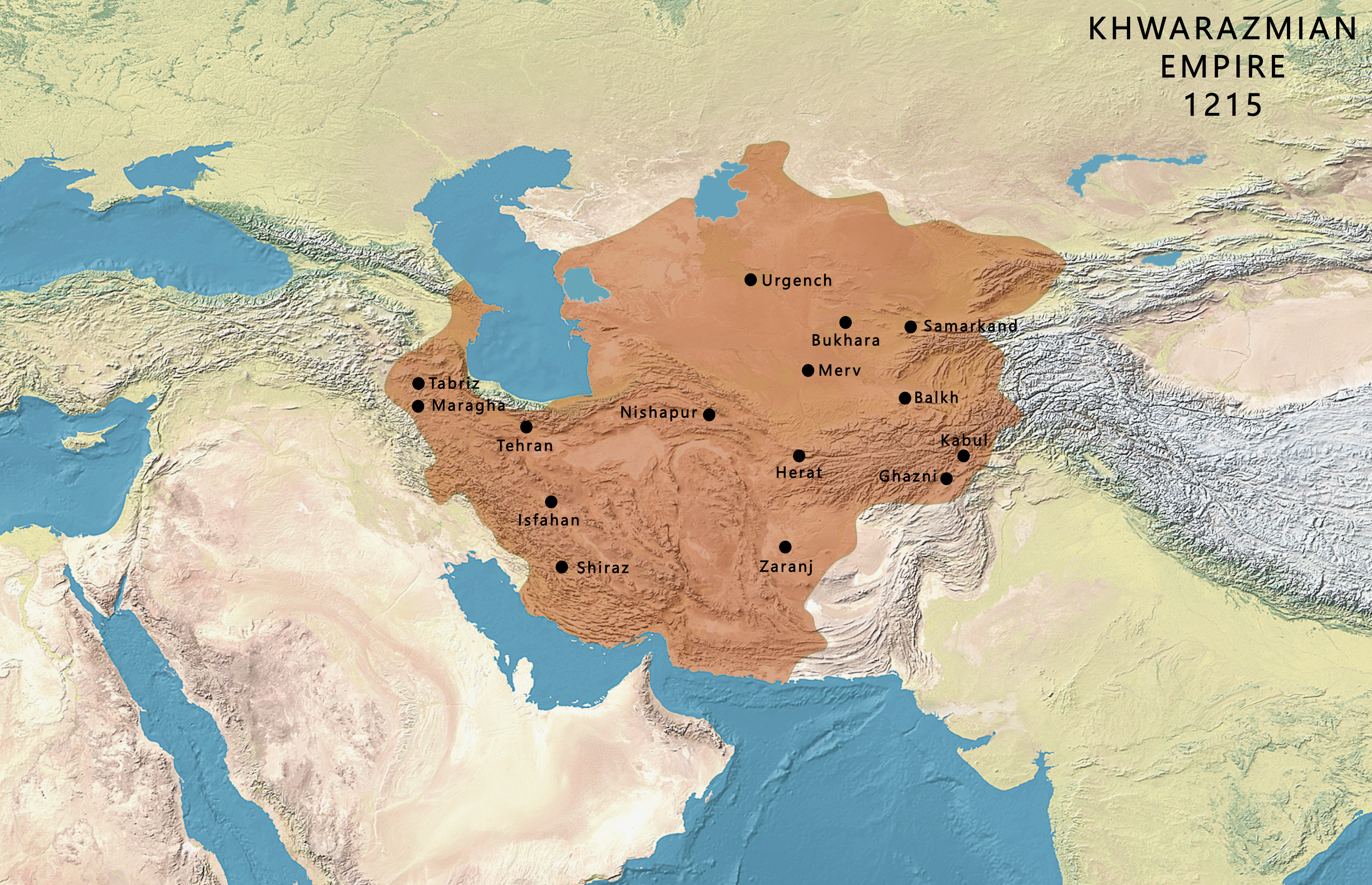
- Territory of the Khwarazmian Empire on the eve of the Mongol invasions, c. 1215
- Status: Empire (1170s–1221); Rump state (1225–1231)
- Capital: Gurganj (1077–1212); Samarkand (1212–1220); Ghazni (1220–1221); Tabriz (1225–1231)
- Largest city: Shahr-e Ray
- Common languages: Persian (official); Arabic; Cuman Turkic; Oghuz Turkic
- Religion: Sunni Islam
- Government: Absolute monarchy
- Khwarazmshah
  - 1077–1097: Anushtegin Gharchai
  - 1097-1127: Muhammad I
  - 1127-1156: Atsiz
  - 1156-1172: Il-Arslan
  - 1172-1200: Tekish
  - 1200-1220: Muhammad II
  - 1220-1231: Jalal al-Din Mangburni
- Historical era: Medieval
  - Established: c. 1077
  - Mongol invasion of the Khwarazmian Empire: 1219–1221
  - Battle of Yassıçemen: 1230
  - Disestablished: 1231

Area
- 1210 est. or: 2,300,000 km^{2} (890,000 sq mi)
- 1218 est.: 3,600,000 km^{2} (1,400,000 sq mi)

Population
  - 1220 (Note: Additionally, the population of roughly the same area (Persia and Central Asia) plus some others (Caucasia and northeast Anatolia) is estimated at 5–6 million nearly 400 years later, under the rule of the Safavid dynasty.): 5,000,000−20,000,000
- Currency: Dirham
Preceded by
Seljuk Empire
Ghurid dynasty
Qara Khitai
Kara-Khanid Khanate
Eldiguzids
Ahmadilis
Bavand dynasty
Ghaznavids
Succeeded by
Mongol Empire

The Khwarazmian Empire (Note: Also spelt Khwarezmian, Khorezmian or Chorasmian Empire in English.) (English: /kwəˈræzmiən/), or simply Khwarazm, (Note: Persian: خوارزم, romanized: Khwārazm.) was a culturally Persianate, Sunni Muslim empire of Turkic mamluk origin, ruled by the Anushtegin dynasty. The Khwarazmian Empire ruled large parts of present-day Central Asia, Afghanistan, and Iran from 1077 to 1231; first as vassals of the Seljuk Empire and the Qara Khitai (Western Liao dynasty), and from circa 1190 as independent rulers up until the Mongol invasion in 1219–1221.

The date of the founding of the state remains debatable. The dynasty that ruled the empire was founded by Anush Tigin (Gharachai), initially a Turkic slave of the rulers of Gharchistan, later a Mamluk in the service of the Seljuks. However, it was under Ala ad-Din Atsiz (r. 1127–1156), a descendant of Anush Tigin, that Khwarazm became independent from its neighbors.

The Khwarazmian Empire eventually became the most powerful state in and around Persia, defeating the Seljuk Empire and claiming territory from the western regions of the Ghurid Empire, and even threatening the Abbasid Caliphate. It is estimated that the empire spanned an area of 2.3 to 3.6 million square kilometres. The empire, which was modelled on the preceding Seljuk Empire, was defended by a huge cavalry army composed largely of Kipchak Turks.

In 1219, the Mongols under their ruler Genghis Khan invaded the Khwarazmian Empire, conquering most of it in just two years. The Mongols exploited existing weaknesses and conflicts in the empire, besieging and plundering the richest cities, and putting its citizens to the sword in one of the bloodiest conquests in human history. A Khwarazmian rump state survived in western Iran until 1231; it was conquered by the Mongols only after the death of Jalal al-Din Mangburni, the last Khwarazmshah.

== History ==
=== Early history ===
The title of Khwarazmshah was introduced in 305 by the founder of the Afrighids and existed until 995. After a short interval, the title was reinstated. During the uprising in Khwarazm in 1017, rebels killed Khwarazmshah Ma'mun II and his wife Khurra-ji, the sister of Ghaznavid sultan Mahmud of Ghazni. In response, Mahmud invaded the region to quell the rebellion. He later installed a new ruler and annexed Khwarazm. As a result, it became a province of the Ghaznavid Empire and remained so until 1035.

In 1077, control of the region, which had previously belonged to the Seljuqs from 1042 to 1043, passed into the hands of Anushtegin Gharchai, a Turkic mamluk commander of the Seljuqs. In 1097, the Turkic governor of Khwarazm, Ekinchi ibn Qochqar declared independence from the Seljuqs and proclaimed himself the Shah of Khwarazm. After a short time, however, he was killed by several Seljuq amirs who had rebelled. He was replaced by Anush Tigin Gharachai's son, Qutb al-Din Muhammad, by the Seljuqs, who had reconquered the region. Qutb al-Din became the first hereditary Khwarazmshah.

=== Rise ===
==== Anushtegin Gharachai ====
Anushtegin Gharachai was a Turkic (Note: Medieval historians such as Hafiz-i Abru and Rashid al-Din believed that Anushtegin was of Begdili tribe of Oghuz Turks, while Turkish historian Kafesoğlu states that Anushtegin was either of Khalaj or Chigil origin and the Bashkir historian Zeki Velidi Togan believes he was of Qipchaq, Qanghli or Uyghur descent.) mamluk commander of the Seljuqs and the governor of Khwarazm from approximately 1077 until 1097. He was the first member of his family to rule Khwarazm and the namesake for the dynasty that would rule the province in the 12th and early 13th centuries.

Anushtegin was put in command together with his master al-Taj Gümüshtegin in 1073 by the Seljuq sultan Malik-Shah I to retake territory in northern Khorasan that the Ghaznavids had seized. He was subsequently made the sultan's tasht-dar (Persian: "keeper of the royal vessels"), and, as the revenues from Khwarazm were used to pay for the expenses incurred by this position, he was made governor of the province. The details of his tenure as governor are unclear. He died by 1097 and the post was briefly given to Ekinchi bin Qochqar before being transferred to his son, Qutb al-Din Muhammad.

==== Ala ad-Din Atsiz ====
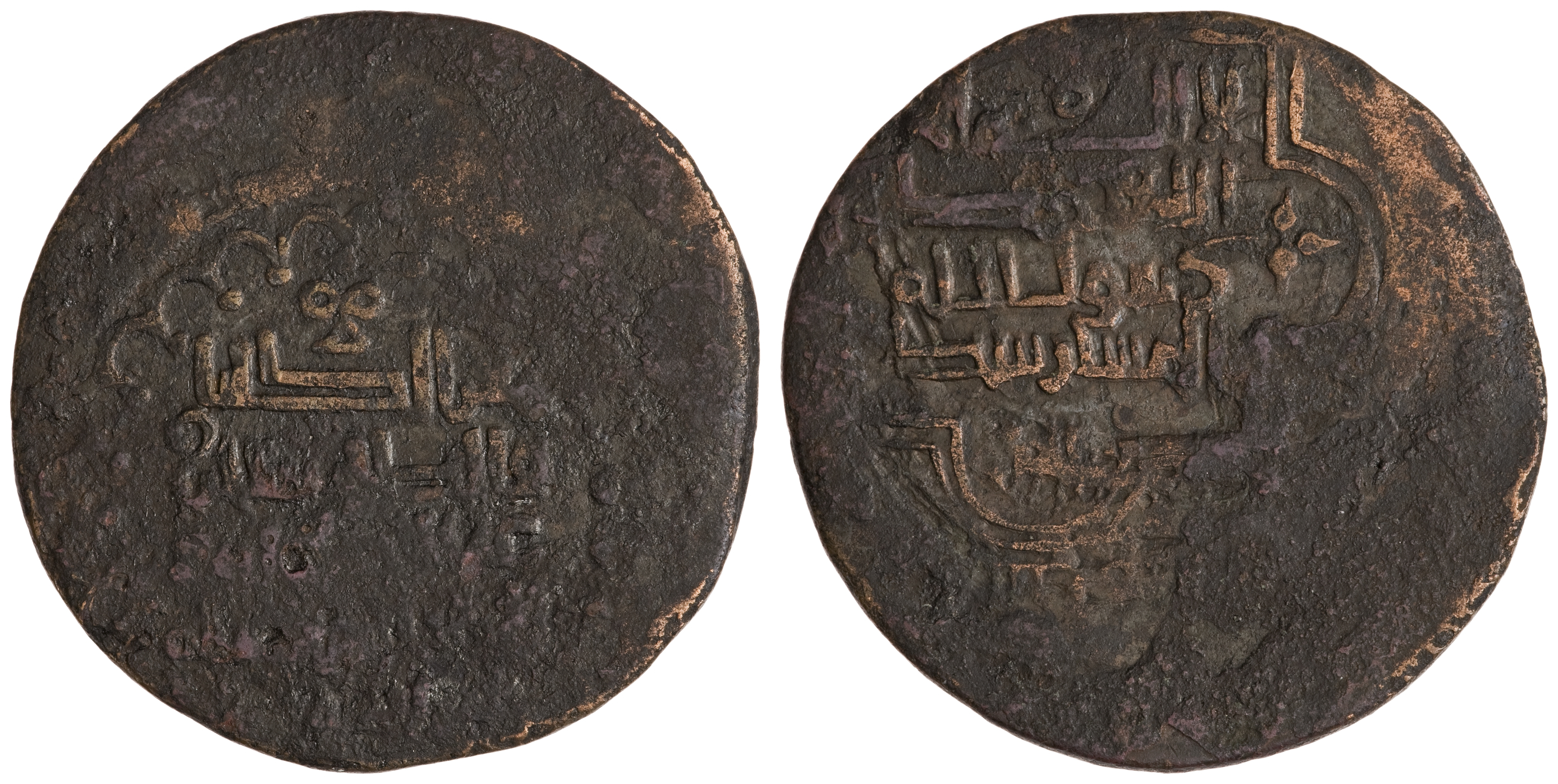
Coin minted under Atsiz, citing his Seljuk suzerain Ahmad Sanjar

Atsiz gained his position following the death of his father, Qutb al-Din, in 1127. During the early part of his reign, he focused on securing Khwarazm against nomadic attacks. In 1138, he rebelled against his suzerain, the Seljuq sultan Ahmad Sanjar, but was defeated in Hazarasp and forced to flee. Sanjar installed his nephew Suleiman Shah as ruler of Khwarazm and returned to Merv. Atsiz returned, however, and Suleiman Shah was unable to hold on to the province. Atsiz then attacked Bukhara, but by 1141 he again submitted to Sanjar, who pardoned him and formally returned control of Khwarazm to him. The same year that Sanjar pardoned Atsiz, the Kara Khitai under Yelü Dashi defeated the Seljuqs in the Battle of Qatwan, near Samarqand. Atsiz took advantage of the defeat to invade Khorasan, occupying Merv and Nishapur. Yelü Dashi, however, sent a force to plunder Khwarazm, forcing Atsiz to pay an annual tribute. In 1142, Atsiz was expelled from Khorasan by Sanjar, who invaded Khwarazm in the following year and forced Atsiz back into vassalage, although he continued to pay tribute to the Kara Khitai until his death. Sanjar undertook another expedition against Atsïz in 1147 when the latter became rebellious again.

Atsiz was a flexible politician and ruler, and was able to maneuver between the powerful Seljuk Sultan Sanjar and the equally powerful Kara Khitai ruler Yelü Dashi. He continued the land-gathering policy initiated by his predecessors, annexing Jand and Mangyshlak to Khwarazm. Many nomadic tribes were dependent on the Khwarazmshah. Towards the end of his life, Atsiz subordinated the entire northwestern part of Central Asia, and in fact, achieved its independence from its neighbors.

=== Territorial expansion ===
==== Il-Arslan and Tekish ====
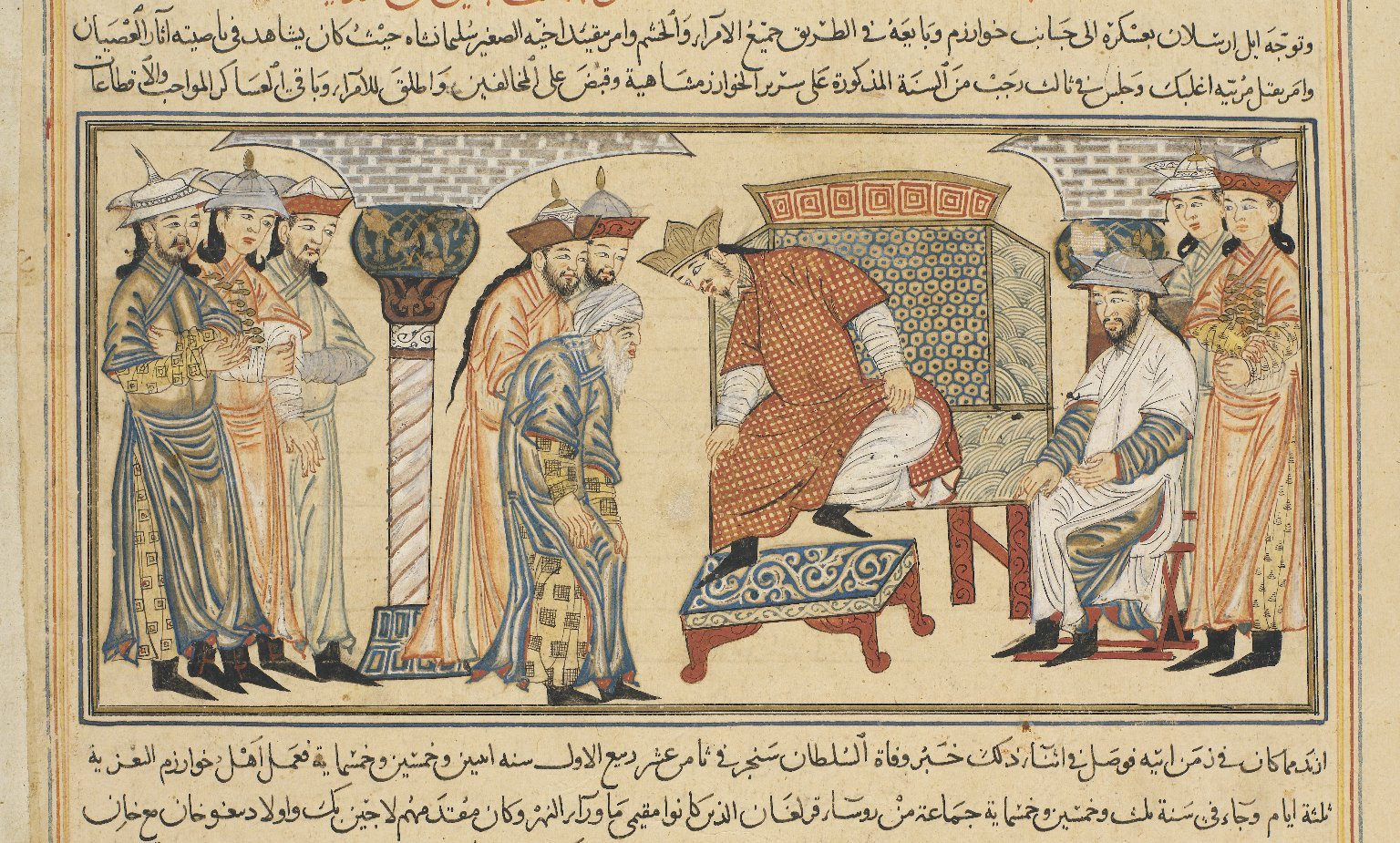
Khwarazmshah Il-Arslan at his coronation, painting from the book Jami' al-Tawarikh (c. 1306–1314)

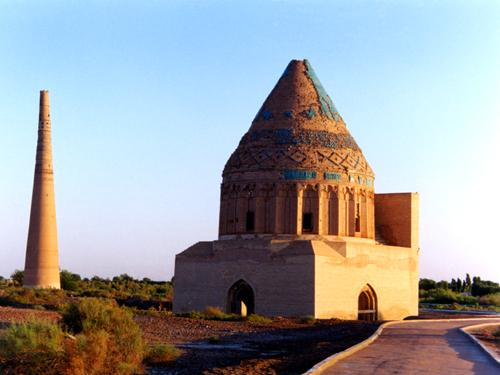
Mausoleum of Ala al-Din Tekish. Gurganj (present-day Konye-Urgench) was the first and most important capital of the Khwarazmian empire.

Il-Arslan was the Shah of Khwarazm from 1156 until 1172. He was the son of Atsïz. Initially, Il-Arslan was made governor of Jand, an outpost on the Syr Darya which had recently been reconquered by his father. In 1156, Atsiz died and Il-Arslan succeeded him as Khwarazmshah. Like his father, he decided to pay tribute to both the Seljuk sultan Sanjar and the Qara Khitai gurkhan.

Sanjar died only a few months after Il-Arslan's ascension, causing Seljuq Khorasan to descend into chaos. This allowed Il-Arslan to effectively break off Seljuk suzerainty, although he remained on friendly terms with Sanjar's successor, Mas'ud. Like his father, Il-Arslan sought to expand his influence in Khorasan.

In 1158, Il-Arslan became involved in the affairs of another Qara Khitai vassal state, the Karakhanids of Samarqand. The Karakhanid Chaghri Khan had been persecuting the Qarluks in his realm, and several Qarluk leaders fled to Khwarazm and sought Il-Arslan's help. He responded by invading the Karakhanid dominions, taking Bukhara and besieging Samarqand, where Chaghri Khan had taken refuge. The latter appealed to both the Turks of the Syr Darya and the Qara Khitai, and the gurkhan sent an army, but its commander hesitated to enter into conflict with the Khwarazmians.

In 1172, the Qara Khitai launched a punitive expedition against Il-Arslan, who had not paid the required annual tribute. The Khwarazmian army was defeated, and Il-Arslan died shortly after. Following his death, the state briefly became embroiled in turmoil, as the succession was disputed between his sons Tekish and Sultan Shah. Tekish emerged victorious and subsequently ruled the empire from 1172 to 1200.

Tekish stayed with the expansionist policies of his father, Il-Arslan. Despite gaining his throne with the help of the Qara Khitai, he later shook off their suzerainty and repulsed the subsequent Qara Khitai invasion of Khwarazm. Tekish maintained close relations with the Oghuz Turkmens and Turkic Qipchak tribes from the vicinity of the Aral Sea, and recruited them at times for his conquest of Iran. A great number of these Turkmens were still pagan, and they were known in Iran for their barbarism and intense ferocity.

In 1194, Tekish defeated the Seljuq sultan of Hamadan, Toghrul III, in an alliance with Caliph al-Nasir, and conquered his territories. After the war, he broke with the Caliphate and was on the brink of a war with it until the Caliph accepted him as the sultan of Iran, Khorasan, and Turkestan in 1198. Tekish died of a peritonsillar abscess in 1200. and was succeeded by his son, Ala ad-Din Muhammad. His death triggered spontaneous revolts and widespread massacre of the hated Khwarazmian Turkic soldiers stationed in Iran.

=== Maximum expansion and decline ===
==== Muhammad II & Turkan Khatun ====
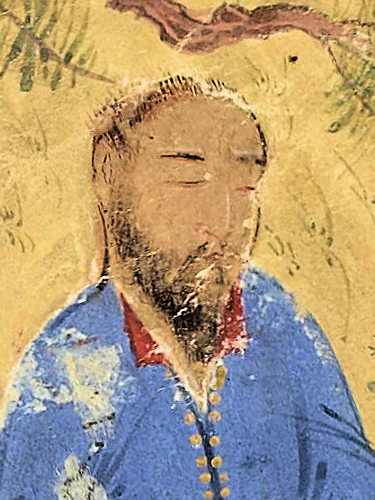
Muhammad II depicted in a 1430 manuscript of the Jami' al-tawarikh by Rashid-al-Din Hamadani

On the eve of the Mongol invasion, a diarchy developed in the Khwarazmian Empire. After his father Tekish died, Ala ad-Din Muhammad succeeded him, becoming known as Khwarazmshah Muhammad II. Muhammad was legally considered the absolute ruler, but the influence of his mother Turkan Khatun (Terken Khatun) was also great. Turkan Khatun even had the laqab: "the Ruler of the World" (Khudavand-e Jahaan), and another one for her decrees: "Protector of peace and faith, Turkan the Great, the ruler of women of both worlds." Turkan Khatun had a separate Diwan, separate palace and the orders of the Sultan were not considered to be effective without her signature. This fact, coupled with her conflicts with Muhammad II, might have contributed to the impotence of the Khwarazmian Empire in the face of the Mongol onslaught.

Initially, Muhammad led the maximum expansion of the Khwarazmian Empire, extinguishing the Western Kara-Khanid Khanate in 1213, and sweeping aside the Ghurids in 1215, whom they vassalized after the assassination of Muhammad Ghuri. The coins of Muhammad were minted in the Kara-Khanid capitals of Uzgen and Samarkand from 1213. Muhammad then turned his attention to an invasion of Persia, and by late 1217, he controlled all of Persian Iraq, with Arran, Azerbaijan, and Derbent becoming his vassals.

==== Fall ====
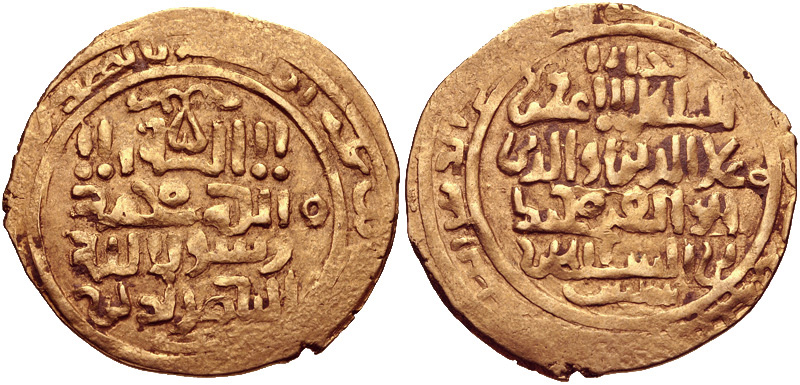
Gold dinar of Ala ad-Din Muhammad II, struck at the Bukhara mint

Meanwhile, the Mongol Empire was expanding closer and closer to Khwarazm. In February 1218, the Mongols defeated and killed Kuchlug Khan, bringing the strategically located cities of Kashgar and Khotan under the control of Genghis Khan, and bringing the Mongols right up to the border of Muhammad's realm. Genghis sent emissaries to Khwarazm to emphasize his hope for a trade road, but having heard exaggerated reports of the Mongols, Muhammad believed this gesture was only a ploy to invade Khwarazm, and rebuffed them.

Muhammad, in turn, had one of his governors (Inalchuq, his uncle) openly accuse the party of spying, seizing their rich goods and arresting the party.

Trying to maintain diplomacy, Genghis sent an envoy of three men to the Shah, to give him a chance to disclaim all knowledge of the governor's actions and hand him over to the Mongols for punishment. The Shah executed the envoy (again, some sources claim one man was executed, some claim all three were), and then immediately had the Mongol merchant party (Muslim and Mongol alike) put to death and their goods seized. These events led Genghis to retaliate with a force of 100,000 to 150,000 men that crossed the Jaxartes in 1219 and sacked the cities of Samarqand, Bukhara, Otrar, and others. Muhammad's capital city, Gurganj, followed soon after. The Shah fled and died of illness in December 1220 on the island of Ashur-Ada in the Caspian Sea.

Meanwhile, Muhammad's mother, Terken Khatun, took the royal treasury, drowned 26 hostages (the sons of different conquered rulers), and fled northward with the harem and children of Khwarazmshah, taking refuge in the Ilal fortress on the coast of the Caspian Sea. But the Mongols besieged and captured the fortress in 1221, taking its inhabitants prisoner. The sons of the Shah were killed, his women and daughters were distributed to the sons and associates of Genghis Khan, and Terken Khatun was taken back to the Mongol homelands, where she died in a state of destitution in 1233.

==== Jalal al-Din Mangburni ====
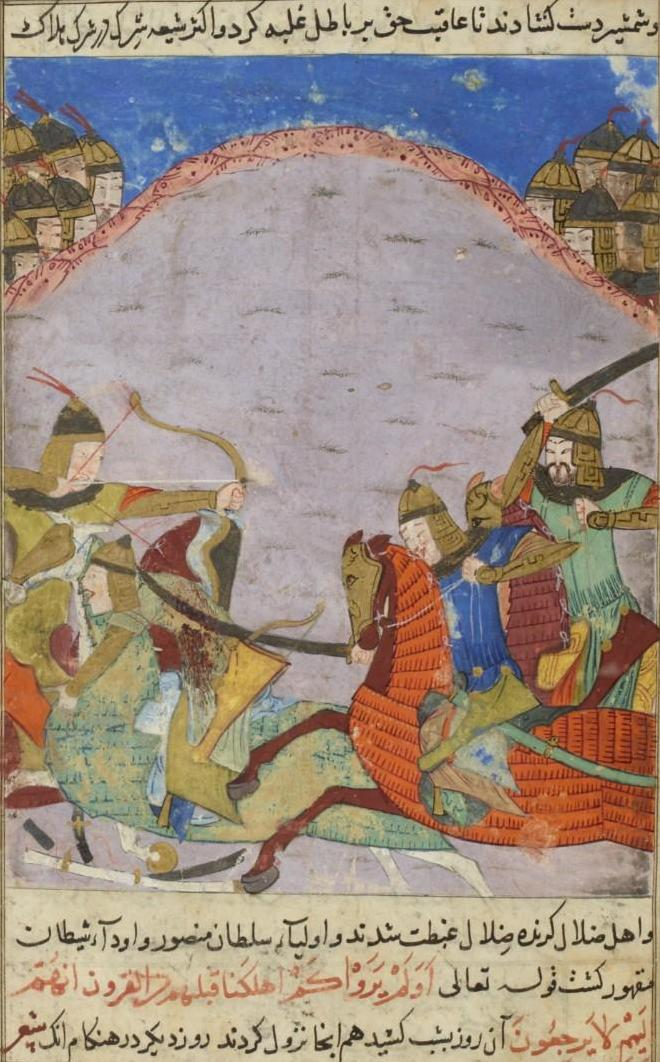
The Georgians (left) against the Khwarezmians led by Jalal al-Din Mangburni (right) at the battle of Bolnisi in 1227. From the Tarikh-i Jahangushay manuscript created in Shiraz, Iran, in 1438.

Jalal al-Din was the last of the Khwarazmshahs, who ruled the remnants of the Khwarazmian Empire and northwestern India from 1220 to 1231. He was reportedly the eldest son of Ala ad-Din Muhammad II, while his mother was a Turkmen concubine named Ay Chichek. Due to the low status of Jalal al-Din's mother, his powerful grandmother and Qipchaq princess Terken Khatun refused to support him as heir to the throne, and instead favored his half-brother Uzlagh-Shah, whose mother was also a Qipchaq. Jalal al-Din first appears in historical records in 1215, when Muhammad II divided his empire amongst his sons, giving the southwestern part (part of the former Ghurid Empire) to Jalal al-Din.

Jalal al-Din inflicted a severe defeat over the Mongols in the Battle of Parwan in 1221. However, immediately after the victory his chiefs quarreled regarding the possession of a horse, during which his father-in-law hit the Khalji leader. When Jalal al-Din refused to punish his father-in-law, the Khaljis left his camp, greatly reducing his strength. At the same time, Genghis Khan himself marched with an army against Jalal al-Din. He attempted to flee to India, but the Mongols caught up with him before he got there, and he was defeated at the Battle of Indus. He escaped and sought asylum in the Sultanate of Delhi. Iltutmish, however, denied this to him in deference to the relationship with the Abbasid caliphs. Returning to Persia, he gathered an army and re-established a kingdom. He never consolidated his power, however, spending the rest of his days struggling against the Mongols, the Seljuks of Rum, and pretenders to his own throne. He lost his power over Persia in a battle against the Mongols in the Alborz Mountains. Escaping to the Caucasus, he captured Azerbaijan in 1225, setting up his capital at Tabriz. In 1226 he attacked Georgia and sacked Tbilisi. Following on through the Armenian highlands, he clashed with the Ayyubids, capturing the town Ahlat along the western shores of Lake Van, which sought the aid of the Seljuq Sultanate of Rûm. Sultan Kayqubad I defeated him at Arzinjan on the Upper Euphrates at the Battle of Yassıçemen in 1230. He escaped to Diyarbakir, while the Mongols conquered Azerbaijan in the ensuing confusion. He was murdered in 1231 by Kurdish highwaymen.

== State apparatus ==
The head of the central state apparatus (al-Majlis al-Ali al-Fahri at-Taji) of Kharazmshahs was a vizier, the first adviser to the head of state. He was the head of the diwan officials (askhab ad-dawawin), who appointed them and established salaries, pensions (arzak), controlled tax administration and the treasury. The most prominent vizier of the Khwarazmian Empire was al-Harawi, who built a mosque for the Shafi'is in Merv, a huge madrassah, a mosque and a repository of manuscripts in Gurganj. He died at the hands of the Shi'a Isma'ilis.

An important position in the state apparatus of the Khwarazmshahs was also held by the senior or great hajib, who most of the time was a representative of the Turkic nobility. The hajib reported to the Khwarazmshah on issues related to the shah and his family. The Khwarazmshah could have several hajibs, who carried out the "personal" instructions of the sultan.

== Population ==
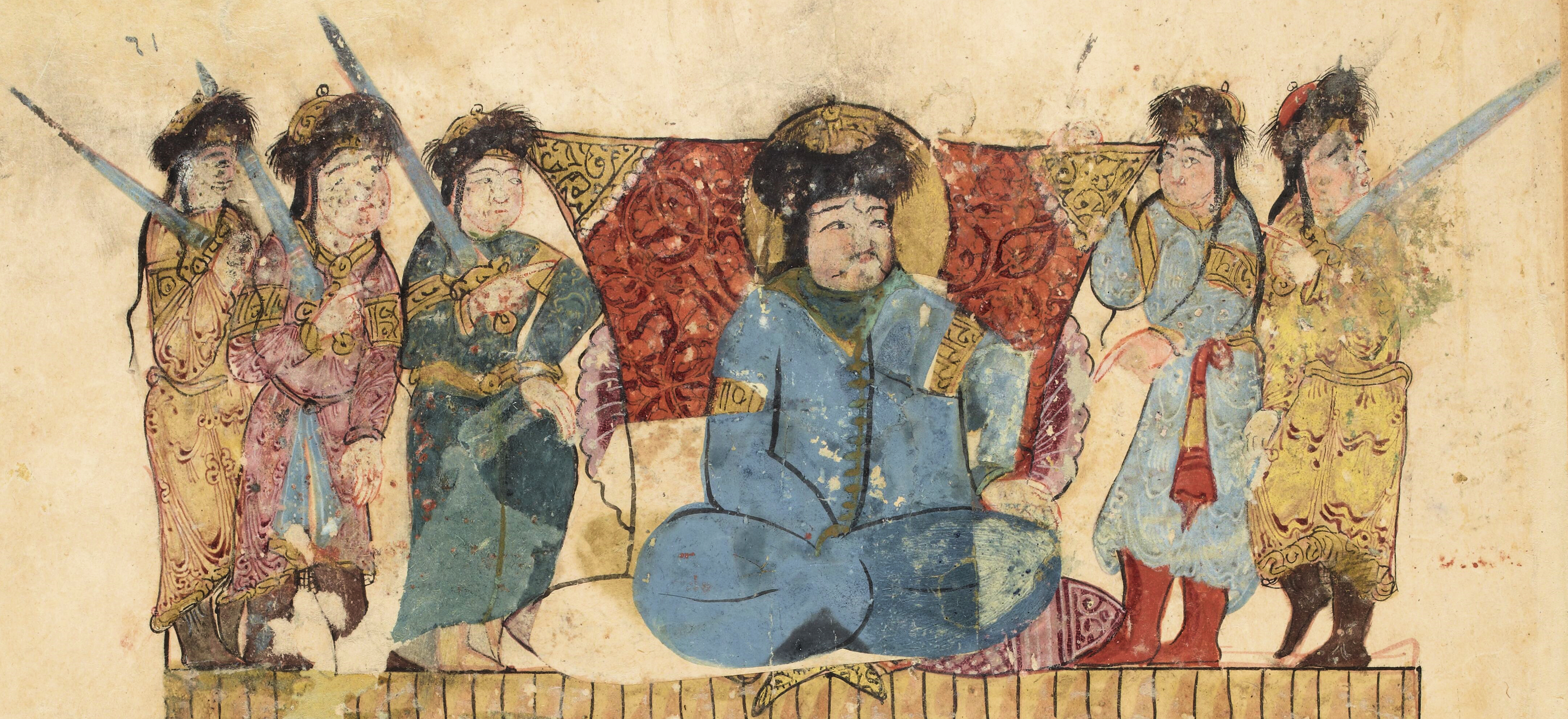
Contemporary depiction of a Turkic amir with guards in Rayy, Iran, 1237. They wear the sharbush headgear, the three-quarters length robe, and boots. Maqamat al-Hariri (1237).

The population of the Khwarazmian Empire consisted mainly of sedentary Iranian and half-nomadic Turkic peoples. The urban population of the empire was concentrated in a relatively small number of (by medieval standards) very large cities as opposed to a huge number of smaller towns. The population of the empire is estimated at 5 million people on the eve of the Mongol invasion in 1220, making it sparse for the large area it covered. Historical demographers Tertius Chandler and Gerald Fox give the following estimations for the populations of the empire's major cities at the beginning of the 13th century, which adds up to at least 520,000 and at most 850,000 people.

== Capital cities ==
Initially, the main city of the Khwarazmian Empire was Urganch or Gurganj. A prominent Middle Eastern biographer and geographer, Yaqut al-Hamawi, who visited Gurganj in 1219, wrote, "I have not seen a city greater, richer and more beautiful than Gurganj." Al-Qazvini, a Persian physician, astronomer, geographer and writer of Arab ancestry, states:

Gurganj is a very beautiful city, surrounded by the attention of angels who represent the city in paradise just like a bride in a groom's house. The inhabitants of the capital were skillful artisans, especially the blacksmiths, carpenters and others. Carvers were famous for their products made of ivory and ebony. Workshops for the production of natural silk operated in the city.

The cities of Samarqand, Ghazna and Tabriz also served as the capital of the later Khwarazmian Empire.

== Culture ==
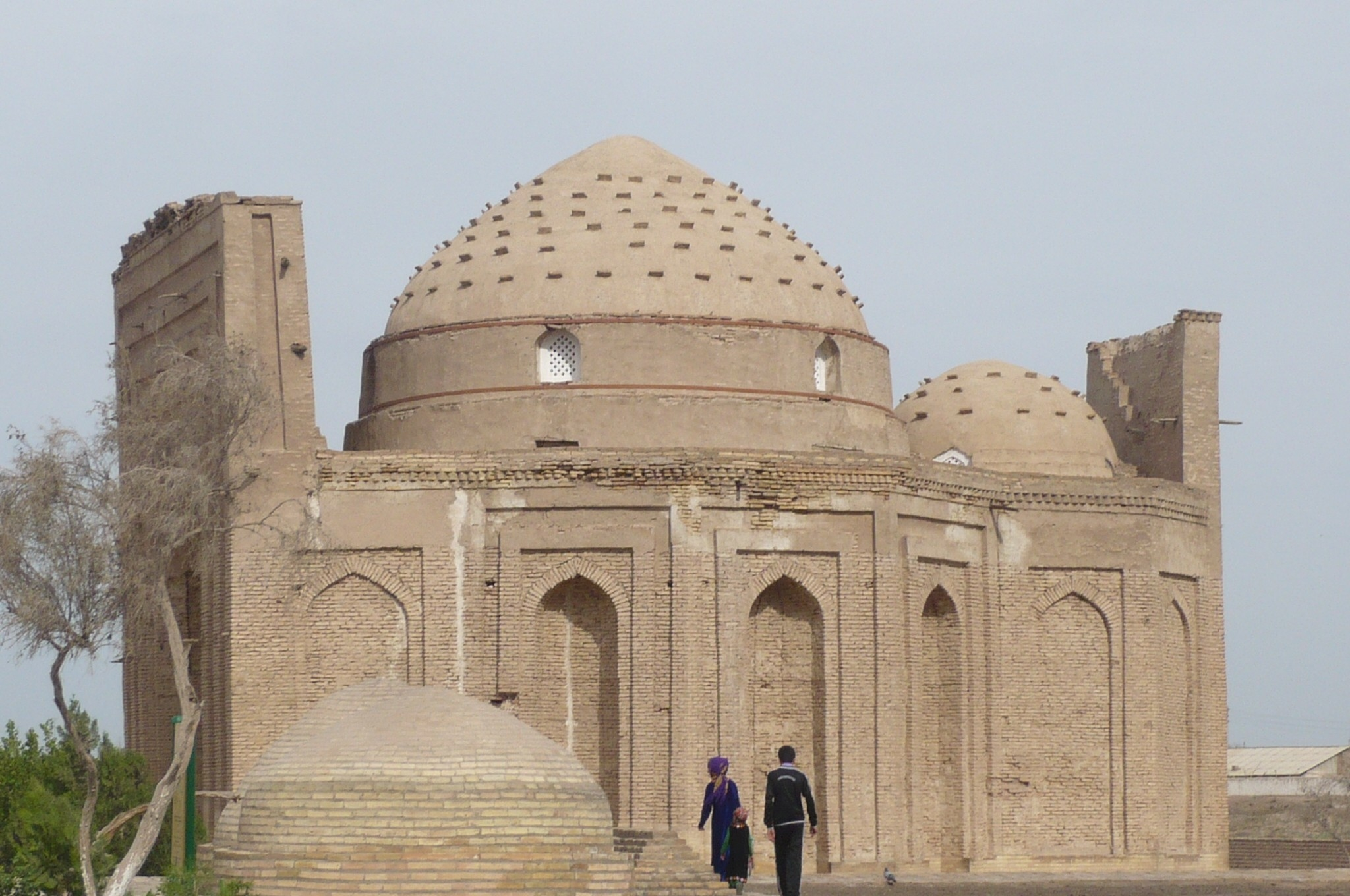
The Mausoleum of a Sufi of Khwarazm, Najm-ad-Din al-Kubra, in old Gurganj (present-day Kunya-Urgench, Turkmenistan)

Although the Khwarazmshahs had a Turkic origin, just as their Seljuq predecessors, they adopted Persian culture, adhered to the Sunni branch of Islam and had their richest and most populous cities in Khorasan. Thus, the Khwarazmshah era had a dual character, reflecting both its Turkic origin and Persian culture.

=== Language ===
During the Khwarazmshah era, Central Asian society was fragmented, unified under one banner only recently. The Khwarazmian military mostly consisted of Turks, while the civilian and administrative element was almost exclusively Persian. The spoken language of the Turkic population of Khwarazm was Kipchak Turkic and Oghuz, the latter being the legacy of the previous masters of the area, Seljuq Turkomans.

However, the dominant language of the era and the one spoken by the majority in the important Khwarazmian cities was Persian. The language of the sedentary diwan was also Persian, and its members had to be well versed in Persian culture, regardless of their ethnic origin. Persian became the official state language of the Khwarazmshahs and served as the language of administration, history, fiction and poetry. The Turkic language was the mother tongue and "home language" of the Anushteginid family, while Arabic served primarily as the language of science, philosophy, and theology.

=== Ceramics in the Khwarazmian period ===
The finely decorated Mina'i ceramics were mainly produced in Kashan, in the decades leading up to the Mongol invasion of Persia in 1219, at a time when the Khwarazmian Empire ruled the area, initially under the suzerainty of the Seljuk Empire, and independently from 1190. Some of the "most iconic" productions of stonepaste vessels can be attributed to the Khwarazmian rulers, after the end of Seljuk domination (the Seljuk Empire itself ended in 1194). In general, it is considered that Mina'i ware was manufactured from the late 12th century and the early 13th century, and dated Mina’i wares range from 1186 to 1224. Extensive lusterware also belongs to this period.

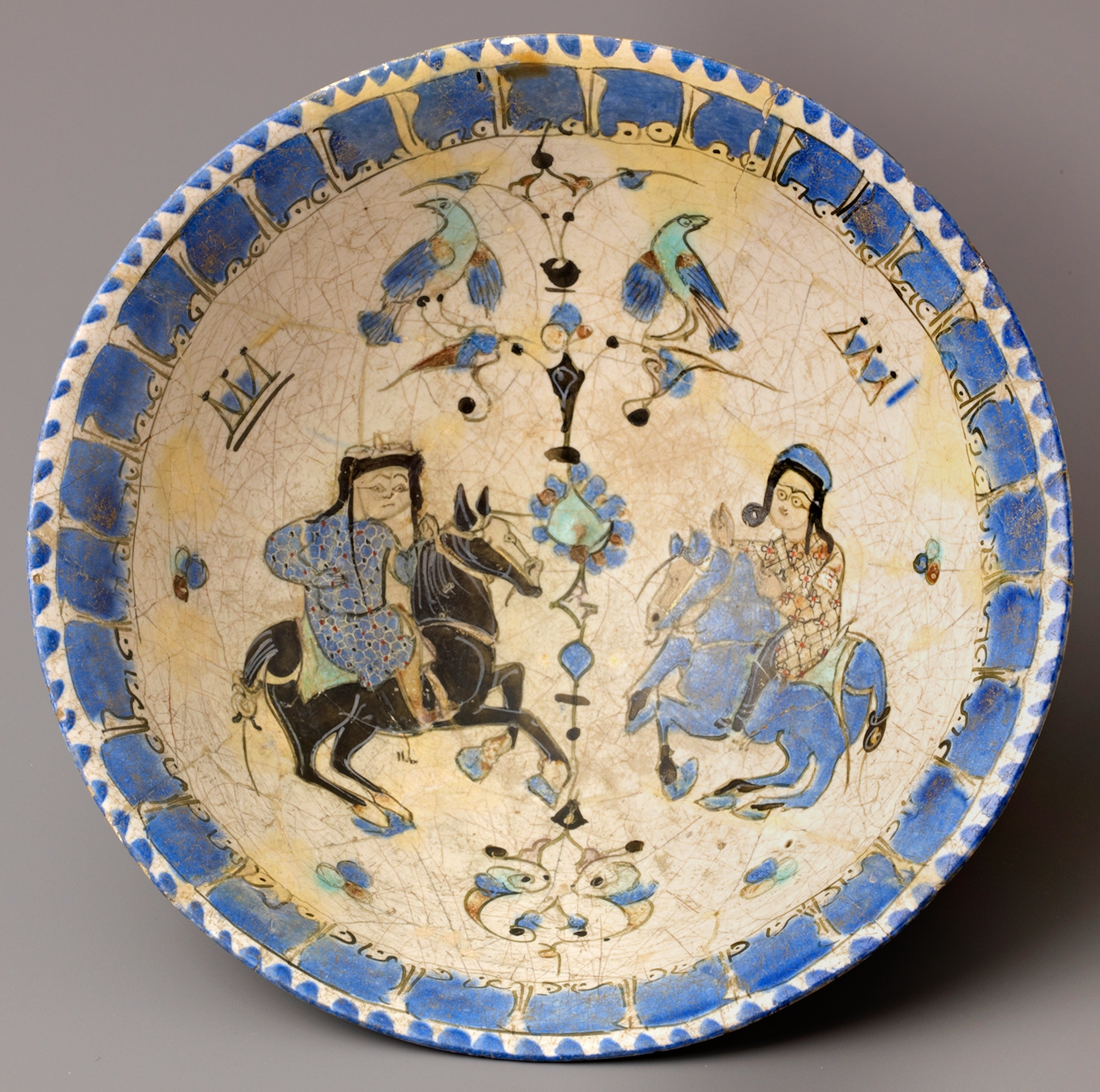
Horsemen, Mina'i ware, early 13th century, Iran

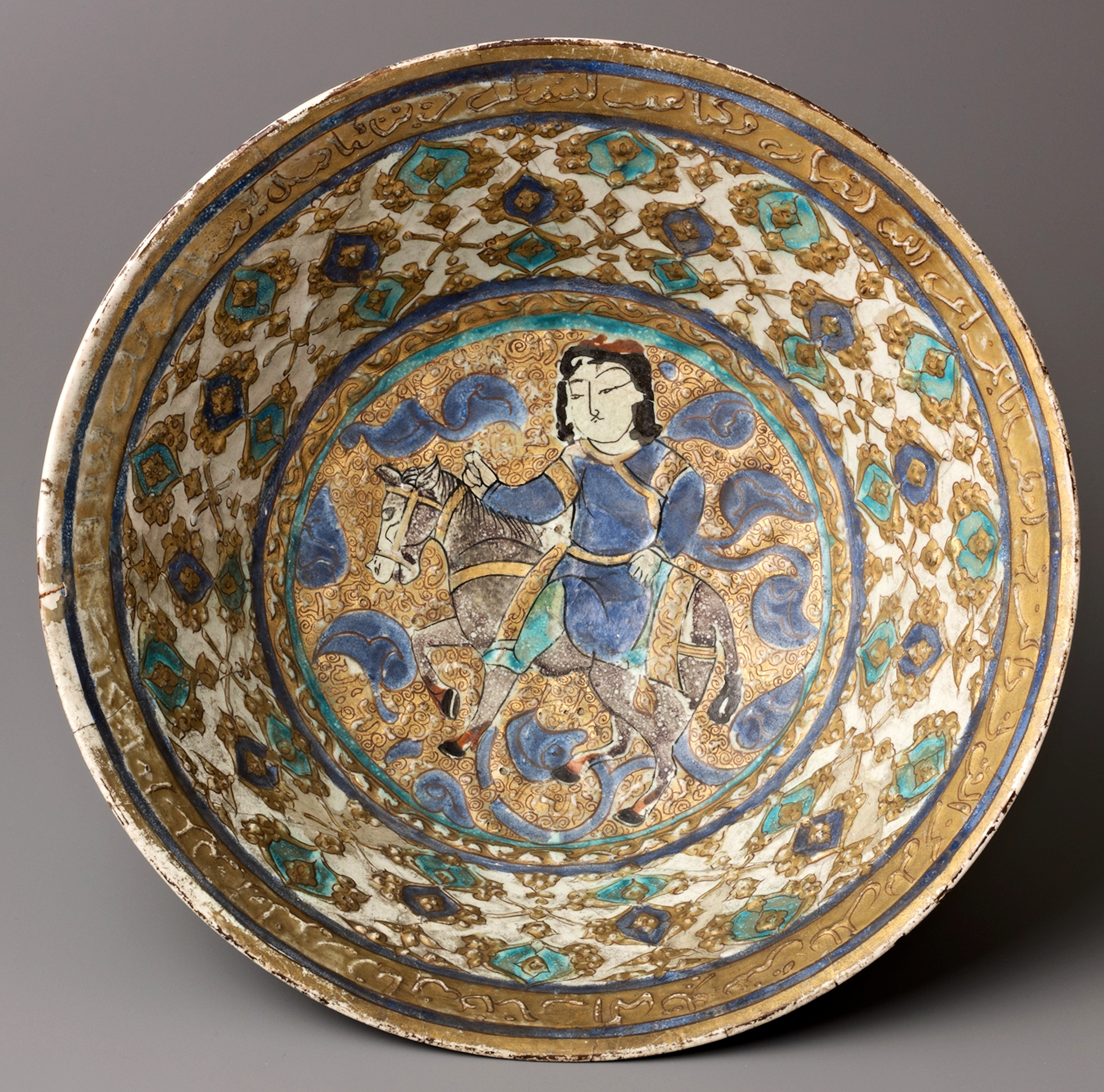
Mina'i Bowl with horserider, early 13th century, Iran

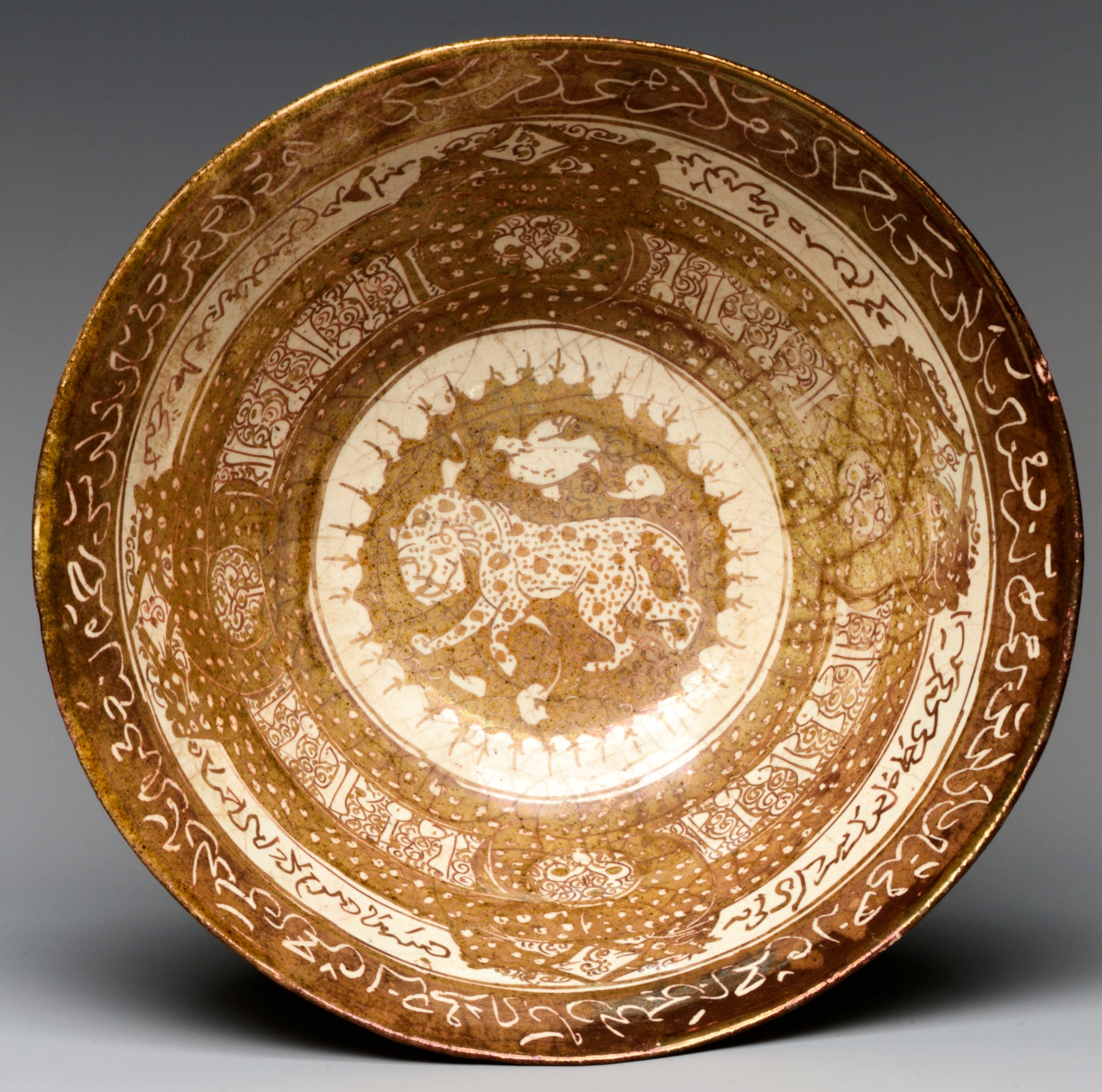
Lusterware bowl with leopard, early 13th century, Kashan, Iran

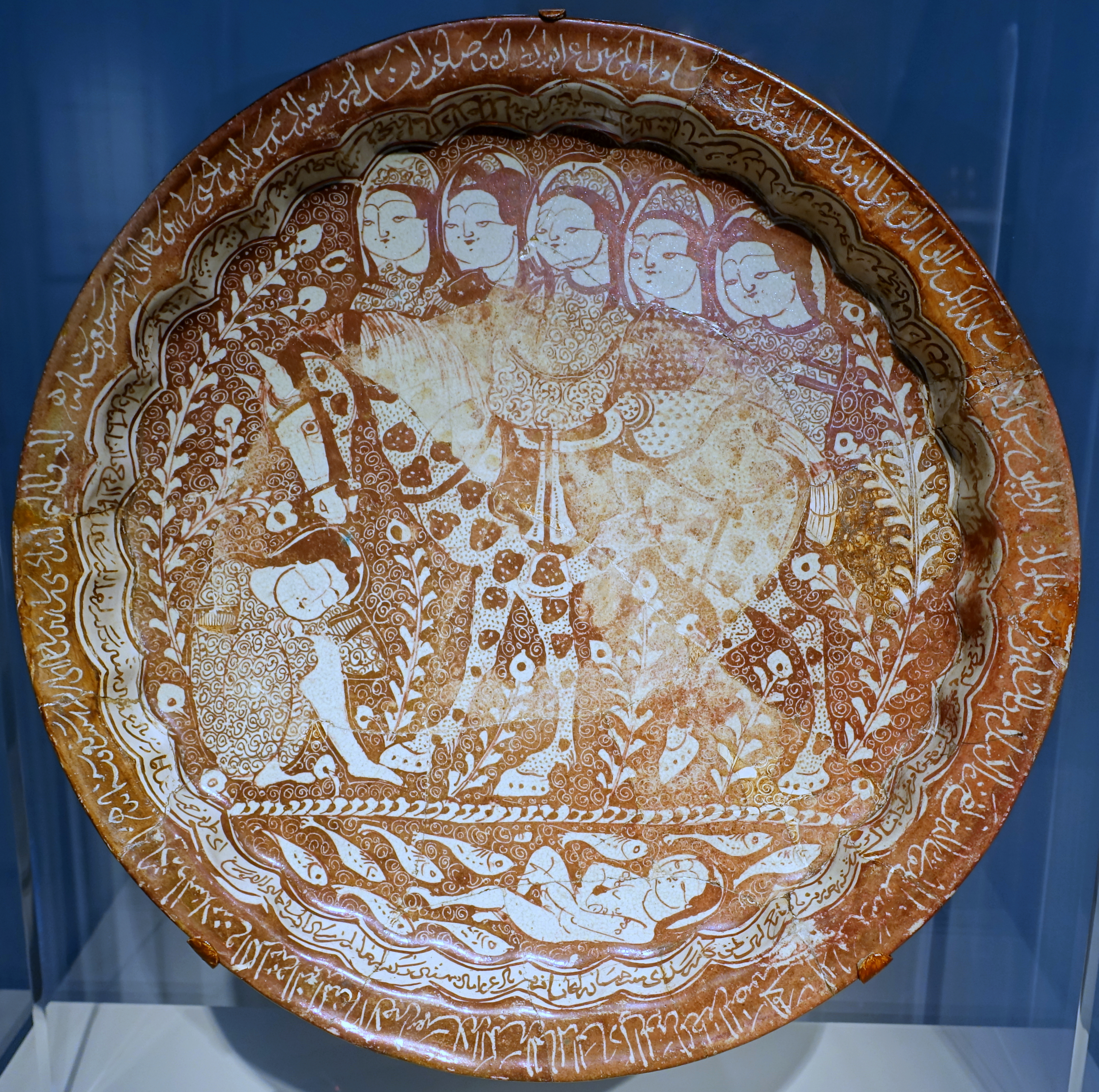
Lustreware plate painted by Abu Zayd al-Kashani in December 1210 (dated AH Jumada II 607).

== Military ==
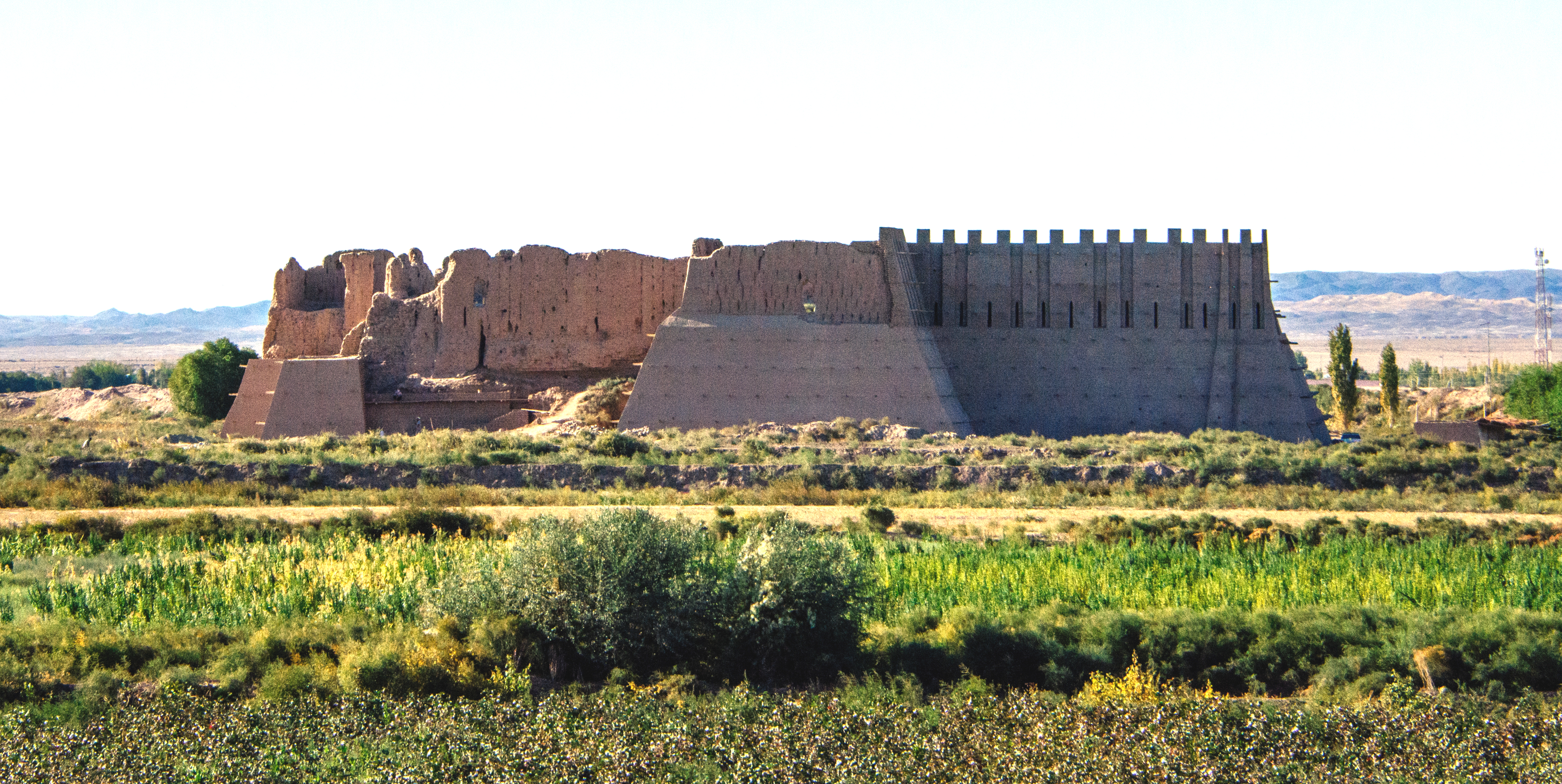
The Khwarazmian fortress of Kyzyl-Kala, under restoration

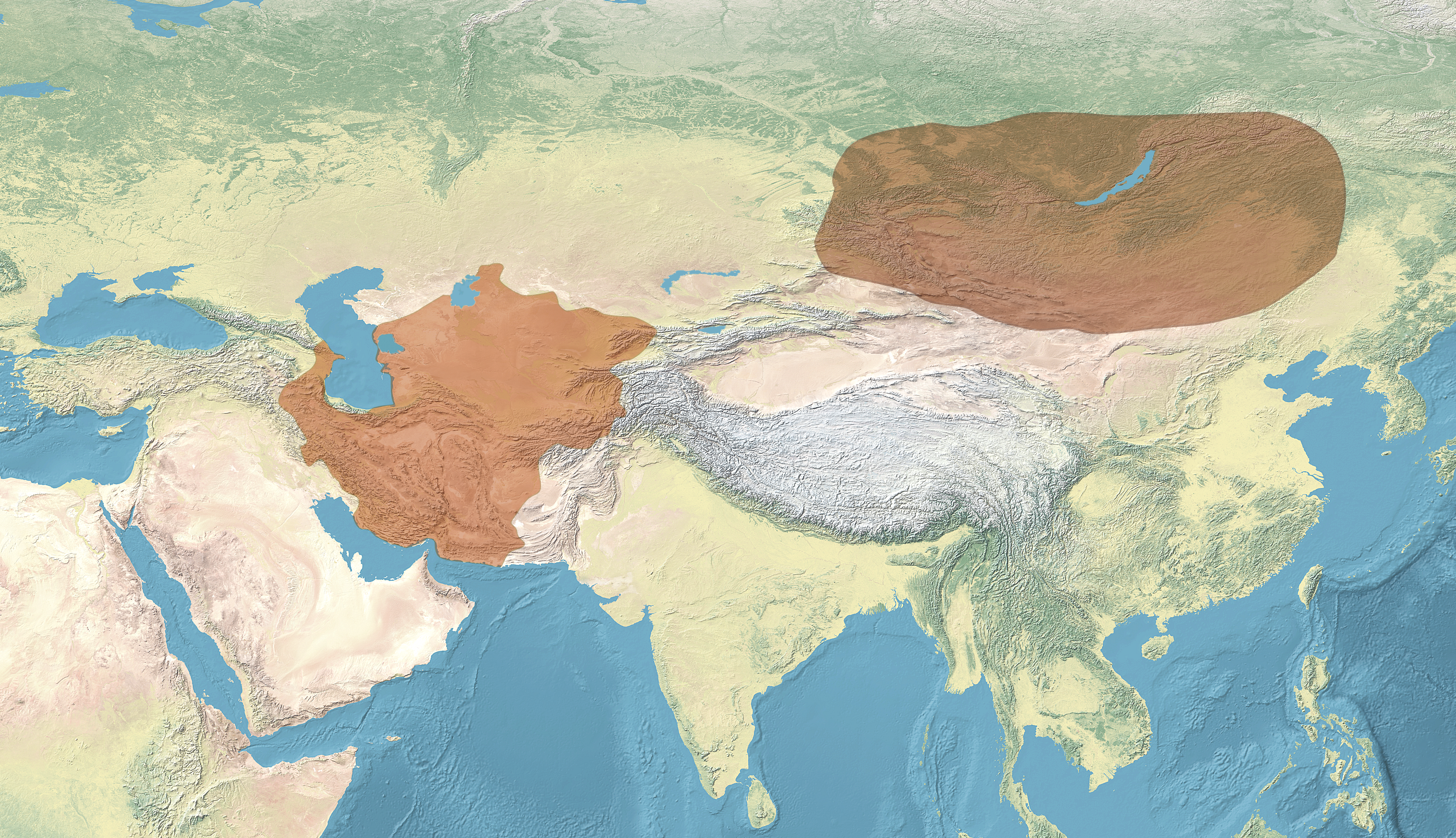
The Khwarazmian Empire and the Mongol Confederation c. 1215, on the eve of the Mongol conquest of the Qara Khitai (1218) and the Mongol invasion of the Khwarazmian Empire (1219–1222)

It is estimated that the Khwarazmian army, prior to the Mongol invasion, consisted of about 40,000 cavalry, mostly of Turkic origin. Militias existed in Khwarazm's major cities but were of poor quality. With collective populations of around 700,000, the major cities probably had 105,000 to 140,000 healthy males of fighting age in total (15–20% of the population), but only a fraction of these would be part of a formal militia with any notable measure of training and equipment.

=== Mercenaries ===
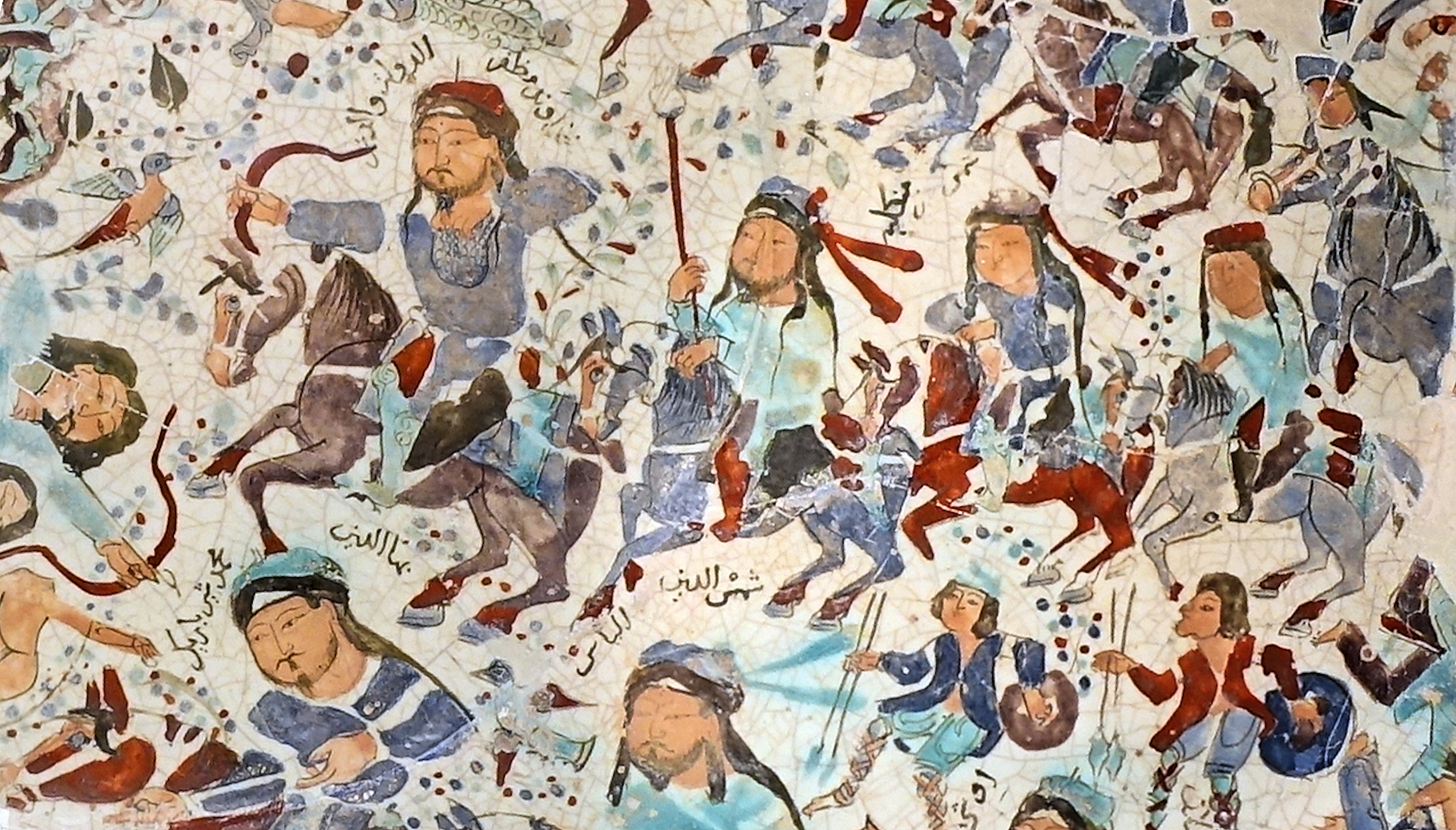
Mina'i bowl depicting battle scene in Khalkhal, Iran, early 13th century. Kashan, Iran.

After the Mongol invasion of the Khwarazmian Empire, many Khwarazmians survived by employing themselves as mercenaries in northern Iraq. Sultan Jalal ad-Din's followers remained loyal to him even after his death in 1231, and raided the Seljuq lands of Jazira and Syria for the next several years, calling themselves the Khwarazmiyya. Ayyubid Sultan as-Salih Ayyub, in Egypt, later hired them against his uncle as-Salih Ismail. The Khwarazmiyya, heading south from Iraq towards Egypt, invaded Crusader-held Jerusalem along the way, on 11 July 1244 (Siege of Jerusalem (1244)). The city's citadel, the Tower of David, surrendered on 23 August, and the Christian population of the city was expelled. This triggered a call from Europe for the Seventh Crusade, but the Crusaders would never again be successful in retaking Jerusalem. After being conquered by the Khwarazmian forces, the city stayed under Muslim control until 1917, when it was taken from the Ottomans by the British.

After taking Jerusalem, the Khwarazmian forces continued south, and on 17 October 1244 fought on the side of the Ayyubids at the Battle of La Forbie, as the Crusaders used to call Harbiyah, a village northeast of Gaza, destroying the remains of the Crusader army there, with some 1,200 knights killed. It was the largest battle involving the Crusaders since the Battle of the Horns of Hattin in 1187.

== See also ==
- List of Sunni Muslim dynasties

== Bibliography ==
- Babayan, K. (2003). Mystics, monarchs, and messiahs: cultural landscapes of early modern Iran. Harvard Center for Middle Eastern Studies.
- Bosworth, Clifford Edmund (1978). "K̲h̲wārazm-S̲h̲āhs". In van Donzel, E.; Lewis, B.; Pellat, Ch. & Bosworth, C. E. (eds.). The Encyclopaedia of Islam, Second Edition. Volume IV: Iran–Kha. Leiden: E. J. Brill. ISBN 978-90-04-05745-6. OCLC 758278456.
- Bosworth, Clifford Edmund (1984). "Āl-e Maʾmūn". Encyclopaedia Iranica, Vol. I, Fasc. 7. pp. 762–764.
- Contadini, Anna (1 January 2012). A World of Beasts: A Thirteenth-Century Illustrated Arabic Book on Animals (the Kitāb Na't al-Ḥayawān) in the Ibn Bakhtīshū' Tradition. Brill. doi:10.1163/9789004222656_005.
- Hillenbrand, Robert (1 January 2010). "The Schefer Ḥarīrī: A Study in Islamic Frontispiece Design". Arab Painting. pp. 117–134. doi:10.1163/9789004236615_011. ISBN 978-90-04-23661-5.
- Katouzian, Homa (2007). Iranian History and Politics: The Dialectic of State and Society. Routledge. ISBN 978-0415297547.
- Kuznetsov, Andrew; Fedorov, Michael (2013). "Late Drachms of the Khwārazmshāh Azkājvār and Imitations of such Drachms". Iran: Journal of the British Institute of Persian Studies. 51 (1). Taylor & Francis: 145–149.
