= Anushtegin Gharchai =

Commander of the Seljuk army and the governor of Khwarazm

Governor of Khwarazm
- In office 1077–1097
- Preceded by: Arslan Arghun
- Succeeded by: Ekinchi

Personal details
- Died: 1097
- Children: Muhammad I

Anushtegin Gharchai (also spelled Anush-Tegin; Persian: نوشتکین غرچه, romanized: Anūštigin Ḡaṛčaʾī; died 1097) was a Turkic slave commander (ghulam) of the Seljuks and the governor of Khwarazm from approximately 1077 until 1097. He was the first member of his family to play a role in the history of Khwarazm, and the namesake for the dynasty that would rule the province in the 12th and early 13th centuries.

== Name ==
Anushtegin is a combination of the Iranian word nush/anush ("undying", "born of an undying parent") and the Turkic word tegin ("prince"), thus meaning "immortally-born prince".

== Biography ==
Map of Khwarazm

Anushtegin was originally a Turkic (Note: Kafesoğlu believes Anushtegin was either of Khalaj or Chigil origin, while the Bashkir historian Zeki Velidi Togan considered him to be of Qipchaq, Qanghli or Uyghur descent.) slave from Gharchistan (hence his surname "Gharchai"), but was later sold to the Seljuk officer Gumushtegin Bilge-Beg. Anushtegin first appears in records in 1073, when he and Gumushtegin Bilge-Beg were sent by the Seljuk sultan Malik-Shah I (r. 1072–1092) to reconquer territory in northern Khorasan seized by the Ghaznavid ruler Ibrahim (r. 1059–1099). They defeated the latter and razed a Seljuk-Ghaznavid frontier place named Sakalkand. Anushtegin served as the tashtdar (keeper of the royal washing bowls) of the Seljuks, and, as the revenues from the Central Asian province of Khwarazm were used to pay for the expenses incurred by this position, he was made governor of the province, in c. 1077. Anushtegin bore the title of shihna (military governor) of Khwarazm, as well as the traditional title of Khwarazmshah.

Since the defeat of the Oghuz Yabghu leader Shah Malik in 1042, Khwarazm had been governed by representatives of the Seljuk Empire. The province would go on to play a minor role in eastern Islamic history for the next decades. The Seljuk sultans deliberately gave the governorship of Khwarazm to Turkic slave-soldiers (ghulam) rather than Seljuk princes, with the exception of Arslan Arghun, who governed the province during the reign of his brother Alp Arslan (r. 1063–1072) and early reign of Malik‑Shah I. Geographically, Khwarazm was a peninsula that bordered the Turkic steppes, and as a result was subject to their neighbours' political and linguistic influence. During this period, the local Iranian population of Khwarazm was gradually being assimilated by the Turks. However, during the Seljuk period, the Khwarazmian language (which resembled Sogdian and to a lesser extent Ossetian) was commonly spoken and written.

The details of Anushtegin's tenure as governor are unclear, but he died by 1097 and the post was briefly given to Ekinchi before being transferred to his son, Muhammad I, whose accession is considered the start of the fourth and most prominent line of the Khwarazmshahs (which existed from 1097 to 1231). This new empire would go on to become the most powerful in the eastern Islamic world until the advent of the Mongols.

== Sources ==
- Bosworth, Clifford Edmund (1968). "The Political and Dynastic History of the Iranian World (A.D. 1000–1217)". In Boyle, John Andrew (ed.). The Cambridge History of Iran. Vol. 5. Cambridge: Cambridge University Press. pp. 1–202. doi:10.1017/CHOL9780521069366.002. ISBN 0-521-06936-X. (subscription required)
- Bosworth, Clifford Edmund (1977). The Later Ghaznavids: Splendour and Decay : the Dynasty in Afghanistan and Northern India, 1040–1186. Columbia University Press. ISBN 978-0-231-04428-8.
- Bosworth, Clifford Edmund (1978). "K̲h̲wārazm-S̲h̲āhs". In van Donzel, E.; Lewis, B.; Pellat, Ch. & Bosworth, C. E. (eds.). The Encyclopaedia of Islam, Second Edition. Volume IV: Iran–Kha. Leiden: E. J. Brill. OCLC 758278456.
- Bosworth, Clifford Edmund (1986). "Anuštigin Ĝarčāī". Encyclopaedia Iranica, Vol. II, Fasc. 2. p. 140.
- Bosworth, Clifford Edmund (2008). "Khwarazmshahs i. Descendants of the line of Anuštigin". In Yarshater, Ehsan (ed.). Encyclopædia Iranica. Vol. XIV: Isfahan IX–Jobbāʾi. London and New York: Routledge & Kegan Paul. ISBN 978-1-934283-08-0.

Preceded by Arslan Arghun (?)	Governor of Khwarazm; 1077–1097	Succeeded by Ekinchi
