= Muhammad I of Khwarazm =

Khwarazm Shah

Muhammad I
- Reign: 1097 – 1127
- Predecessor: Ekinchi
- Successor: Atsiz
- Born: Konye-Urgench
- Died: 1127
- Issue: Ala ad-Din Atsiz; Inaltegin; Yusuf
Names
- Laqab: Qutb ad-Din (shortly); Kunya: Abul-Fath; Given name: Muhammad; Turkic nickname: Arslantegin
- Dynasty: Anushtegin
- Father: Anushtegin Gharchai
- Mother: ?
- Religion: Islam

Qutb ad-Din Muhammad (Persian: قطب الدين محمد; full name: Qutb ad-Dunya wa ad-Din Abul-Fath Muhammad Arslantegin ibn Anushtegin) was the first Shah of Khwarezm from 1097 to 1127. He was the son of Anushtegin Gharchai.

Reign

In around 1097, Qutb al-Din Muhammad was appointed governor of Khwarazm by the Seljuk Sultan Berkyaruk's military commander, Habashi ibn Altun-Taq. Habashi had just put down a revolt by two Seljuk amirs, Qodun and Yaruq-Tash, who had killed the previous governor of Khwarazm, Ekinchi, and wanted to rule the province themselves. Qutb al-Din Muhammad therefore took control of Khwarazm and stopped an attempt by Ekinchi's son, Toghril-Tegin, to seize the region.

During his lifetime, Qutb al-Din Muhammad remained loyal to the Seljuk ruler of Khurasan, Ahmad Sanjar. In 1113 or 1114 he assisted a fellow Seljuk vassal, the Karakhanid Arslan Khan, quell turmoil caused by the discontented religious classes in his realm. He also participated in Ahmad Sanjar's military campaign against the Great Seljuk Mahmud II who ruled in western Iran and Iraq, in 1119.

Qutb ad-Din Muhammad is considered the first ruler of the Khwarazmian empire in the sense that he took on the title "Khwarazmshah" in 1100 and established his own polity that wasn't under the direct rule of the Seljuks, which was recognized by his contemporaries.

Qutb ad-Din Muhammad died in 1127 and was succeeded by his son Atsiz.

Preceded by Ekinchi	Shah of Khwarezm; 1097–1127	Succeeded by Atsiz
