= Anushtegin dynasty =

1077–1260 Persianate Sunni Muslim dynasty of Turkic mamluk origin

Anushtegin dynasty خاندان انوشتکین, Khānedāne Ānushtegin
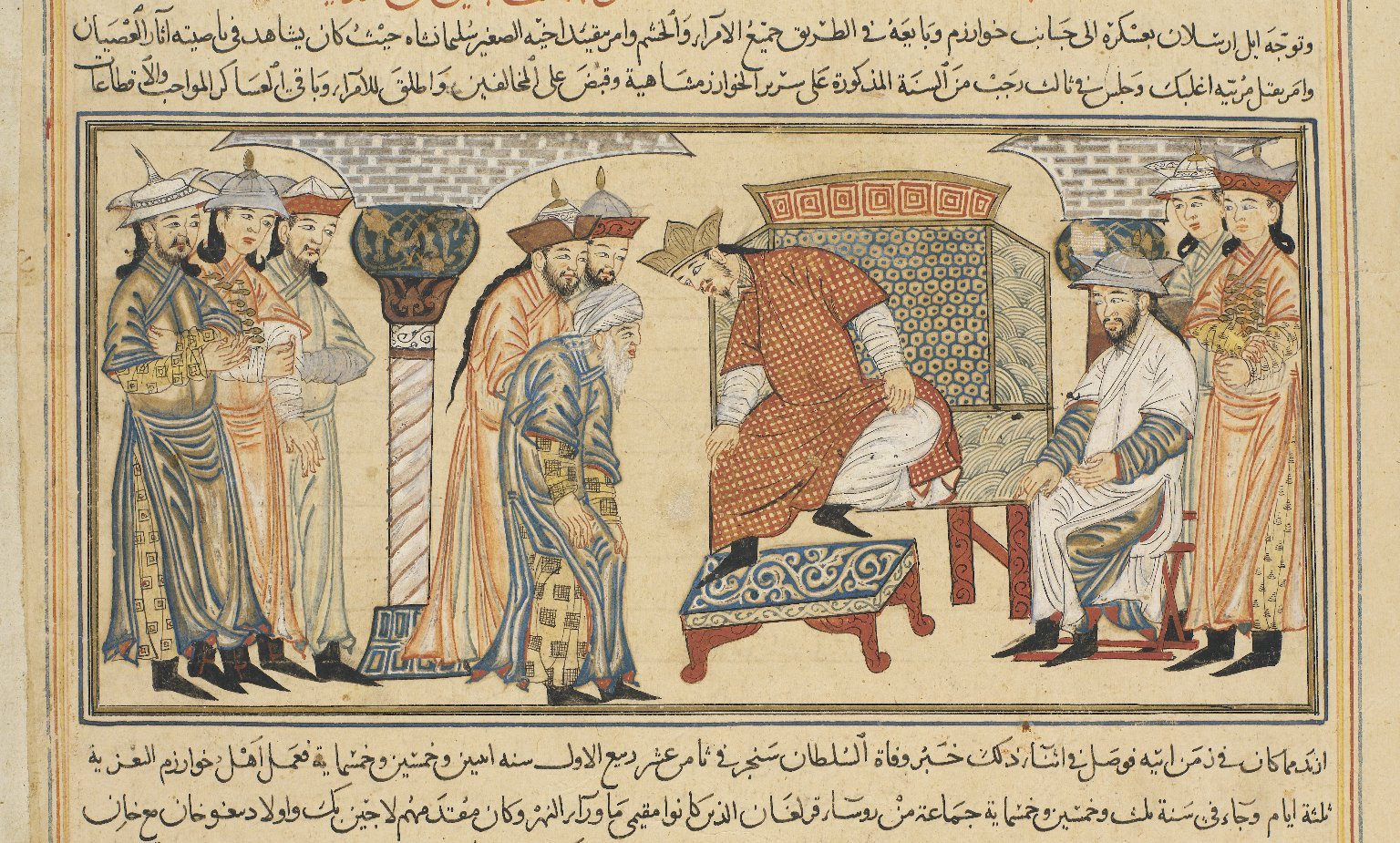
- Parent house: Begdili or Qangli or other
- Country: Khwarazmian Empire; Mamluk Egypt
- Current region: Central Asia; Iran; Afghanistan; Egypt
- Founded: 1077
- Founder: Anushtegin Gharchai
- Final ruler: Saif ad-Din Qutuz
- Titles: Khwarazmshah; Shah; Sultan
- Traditions: Sunni Islam (Hanafi)
- Dissolution: 1260
- Deposition: 1231 (Khwarazmian Empire); 1260 (Mamluk Egypt)

The Anushtegin dynasty or Anushteginids (English: /ænuʃtəˈɡinid/, Persian: خاندان انوشتکین), also known as the Khwarazmian dynasty (Persian: خوارزمشاهیان) was a Sunni Muslim dynasty of Turkic mamluk origin from the Bekdili clan of the Oghuz Turks. The Anushteginid dynasty ruled the Khwarazmian Empire, consisting in large parts of present-day Central Asia, Afghanistan and Iran in the approximate period of 1077 to 1231, first as vassals of the Seljuks and the Qara Khitai (Western Liao), and later as independent rulers, up until the Mongol conquest of the Khwarazmian Empire in the 13th century.

The dynasty was founded by commander Anushtegin Gharchai, a former Turkic slave of the Seljuq sultans, who was appointed as governor of Khwarazm. His son, Qutb ad-Din Muhammad I, became the first hereditary Shah of Khwarazm. Anush Tigin may have belonged to either the Begdili tribe of the Oghuz Turks or to Chigil, Khalaj, Qipchaq, Qangly, or Uyghurs.

== History ==
The date of the founding of the Khwarazmian dynasty remains debatable. During a revolt in 1017, Khwarezmian rebels murdered Abu'l-Abbas Ma'mun and his wife, Hurra-ji, sister of the Ghaznavid sultan Mahmud. In response, Mahmud invaded and occupied the region of Khwarezm, which included Nasa and the ribat of Farawa. As a result, Khwarezm became a province of the Ghaznavid Empire from 1017 to 1034. In 1077, the governorship of the province, which since 1042/1043 belonged to the Seljuqs, fell into the hands of Anush Tigin Gharchai, a former Turkic slave of the Seljuq sultan. In 1141, the Seljuq Sultan Ahmed Sanjar was defeated by the Qara Khitai at the battle of Qatwan, and Anush Tigin's grandson Ala ad-Din Atsiz became a vassal to Yelü Dashi of the Qara Khitan.

Sultan Ahmed Sanjar died in 1156. As the Seljuk state fell into chaos, the Khwarezm-Shahs expanded their territories southward. In 1194, the last Sultan of the Great Seljuq Empire, Toghrul III, was defeated and killed by the Khwarezm ruler Ala ad-Din Tekish, who conquered parts of Khorasan and western Iran. In 1200, Tekish died and was succeeded by his son, Ala ad-Din Muhammad, who initiated a conflict with the Ghurids and was defeated by them at Amu Darya (1204). Following the sack of Khwarizm, Muhammad appealed for aid from his suzerain, the Qara Khitai who sent him an army. With this reinforcement, Muhammad won a victory over the Ghurids at Hezarasp (1204) and forced them out of Khwarizm.

Ala ad-Din Muhammad's alliance with his suzerain was short-lived. He again initiated a conflict, this time with the aid of the Kara-Khanids, and defeated a Qara-Khitai army at Talas (1210), but allowed Samarkand (1210) to be occupied by the Qara-Khitai. He overthrew the Karakhanids (1212) and Ghurids (1215). In 1212, he shifted his capital from Gurganj to Samarkand. Thus incorporating nearly the whole of Transoxania and present-day Afghanistan into his empire, which after further conquests in western Persia (by 1217) stretched from the Syr Darya to the Zagros Mountains, and from the northern parts of the Hindu Kush to the Caspian Sea. By 1218, the empire had a population of 5 million people.

== Anushteginid Khwarazmshahs ==
Titular Name	Personal Name	Reign
Shihna	Anushtegin Gharchai نوشتکین غرچه	1077/1097 C.E.
Shihna	Ekinchi ibn Qochqar ایکینچی بن قوچار	1097 C.E.
Shah شاہ; Qutb ad-Din Abul-Fath قطب الدین ابو الفتح	Arslan Tigin Muhammad ibn Anush Tigin ارسلان طگین محمد ابن أنوش طگین	1097–1127/28 C.E.
Shah شاہ; Ala al-Dunya wa al-Din Abul-Muzaffar علاء الدنیا و الدین، ابو المظفر	Qizil Arslan Atsiz ibn Muhammad قزل ارسلان أتسز بن محمد	1127–1156 C.E.
Shah شاہ; Taj al-Dunya wa al-Din Abul-Fath تاج الدنیا و الدین، ابو الفتح	Il-Arslan ibn Qizil Arslan Atsiz ایل ارسلان بن قزل ارسلان أتسز	1156–1172 C.E.
Shah شاہ; Ala al-Dunya wa al-Din Abul-Muzaffar علاء الدنیا و الدین، ابو المظفر	Tekish ibn Il-Arslan تکش بن ایل ارسلان	1172–1200 C.E.
Shah شاہ; Jalal al-Dunya wa al-Din Abul-Qasim جلال الدنیا و الدین، ابو القاسم	Mahmud Sultan Shah ibn Il-Arslan محمود سلطان شاہ ابن ایل ارسلان; Initially under regency of Turkan Khatun, his mother. He was a younger half-brother and rival of Tekish in Upper Khurasan	1172–1193 C.E.
Shah شاہ; Ala al-Dunya wa al-Din Abul-Fath علاء الدنیا و الدین، ابو الفتح	Muhammad ibn Tekish محمد بن تکش	1200–1220 C.E.
Jalal al-Dunya wa al-Din Abul-Muzaffar جلال الدنیا و الدین، ابو المظفر	Jalal al-Din Mangburni مِنکُبِرنی ابن محمد	1220–1231 C.E.

- Purple Row Signifies Seljuq Empire rule.
  - Pink Row Signifies suzerainty shifting between Qara-Khitai & Seljuq Empire
    - Orange Rows Signify suzerainty of Qara-Khitai

== Family tree of Anushtiginid Dynasty ==
Anushtiginid dynasty family tree

Anushtigin Gharchai (r. 1077-1097); Shihna of Khwarezm
Muhammad I (r. 1097-1127); Shah of Khwarezm
Inaltigin; Prince	Atsiz (r. 1127-1156); Shah of Khwarezm	Yusuf; Prince
Atliq; Prince	Il-Arslan (r. 1156-1172); Shah of Khwarezm	Hitan-Khan; Prince	Suleiman-Shah; Prince
Tekish (r. 1172-1200); Shah of Khwarezm	Sultan-Shah (r. 1172-1193); Shah of Khwarezm
Yunus-Khan; Prince	Ali-Shah (b. ? -d. 1215); Prince	Shah-Khatun; Princess	Muhammad II (r. 1200-1220); Shah of Khwarezm	Toghan-Toghdi; Prince	Malik-Shah (b. ? -d. 1197); Prince
Erboz-Khan; Prince	Hindu-Khan; Prince	Arslan-Khan; Prince
Ak-Shah (b. ? -k. 1221); Prince	Uzlaq-Shah (b. ? -k. 1221); Crown prince	Khan-Sultan; Princess	Qursanjdi (b. ? -k. 1222); Sultan of Persian Iraq	Manguberdi (r. 1220-1231); Sultan of Khwarezm	Pir-Shah (b. ? -k. 1229); Sultan of Kirman	Kumakhti-Shah; Prince	Yahya Hur-Shah (b. ? -k. 1221); Prince	Aysi Khatun; Princess
Qutuz (r. 1259-1260); Sultan of Egypt	Manqatuy-Shah; Prince	Qaymaqar-Shah; Prince

Notes
- Ziya Bunyadov. In Russian, Государство Хорезмшахов-Ануштегинидов. 1097-1231. (State of the Khwarezmshahs-Anushtiginids. 1097-1231). Page 142. PDF

=== Simplified Family Tree ===
Anush-Tegin Dynasty

Khwarezmian Empire
Mamluk Sultanate

Anush-Tegin; Shihna r. 1077–1097
Muhammad I r. 1097–1127
Atsiz r. 1127–1156
Il-Arslan r. 1156–1172
Tuqish r. 1172–1200	Sultan-Shah r. 1172–1172, 1181–1193
Muhammad II r. 1200–1220	Maw'dud
Mengu-Berdi r. 1220–1231	Qutuz r. 1259–1260

== Gallery ==
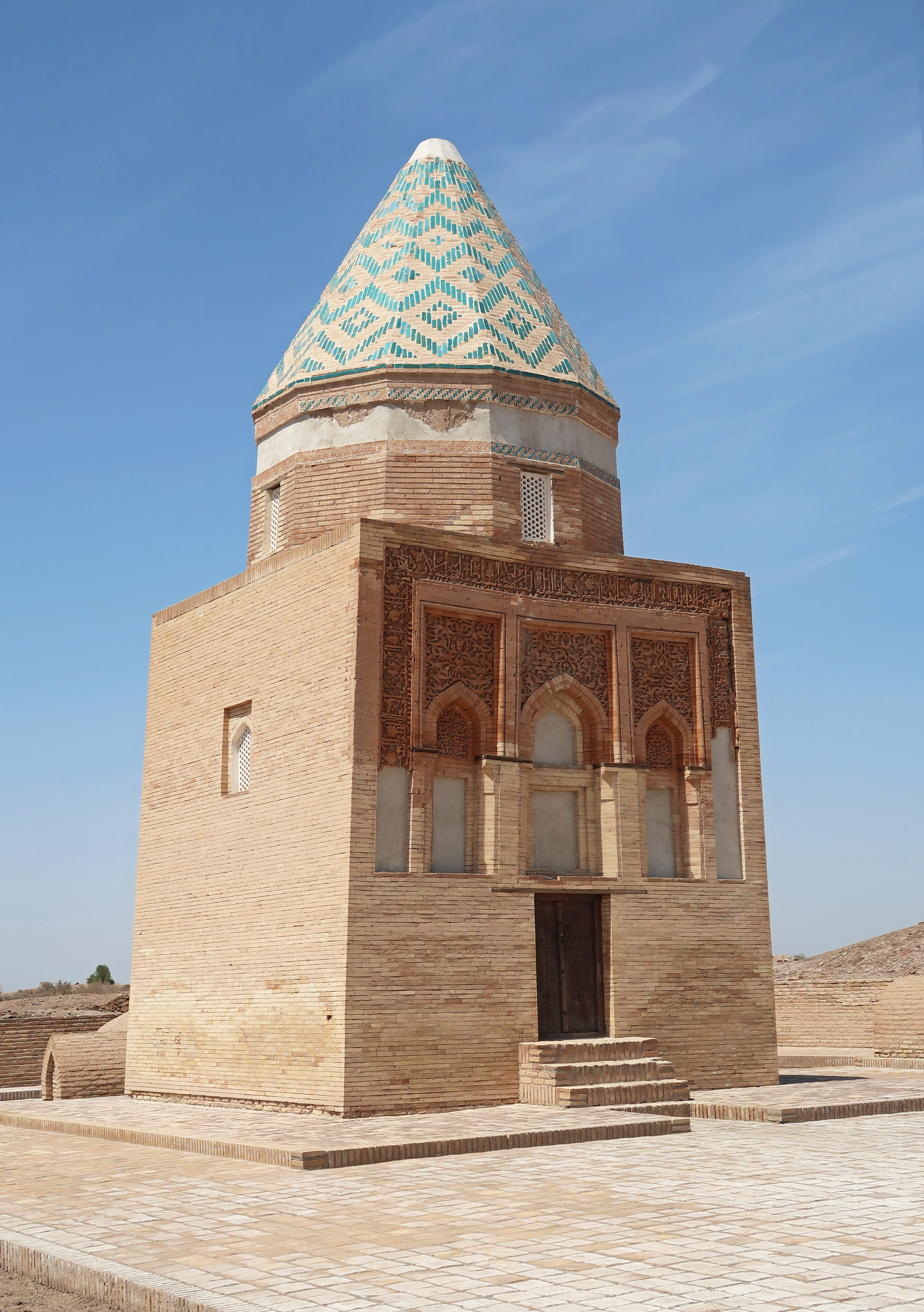
Mausoleum of Khwarazm Shah, Il-Arslan, Köneürgench, Turkmenistan

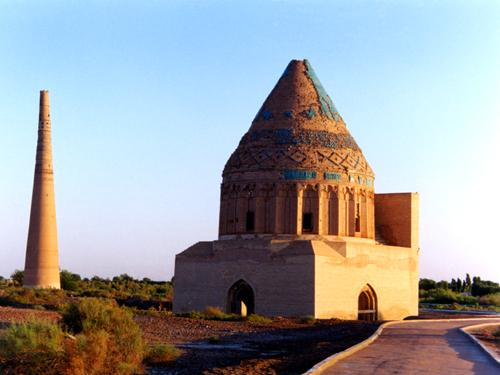
Mausoleum of Khwarazm Shah Tekish, Köneürgench, Turkmenistan

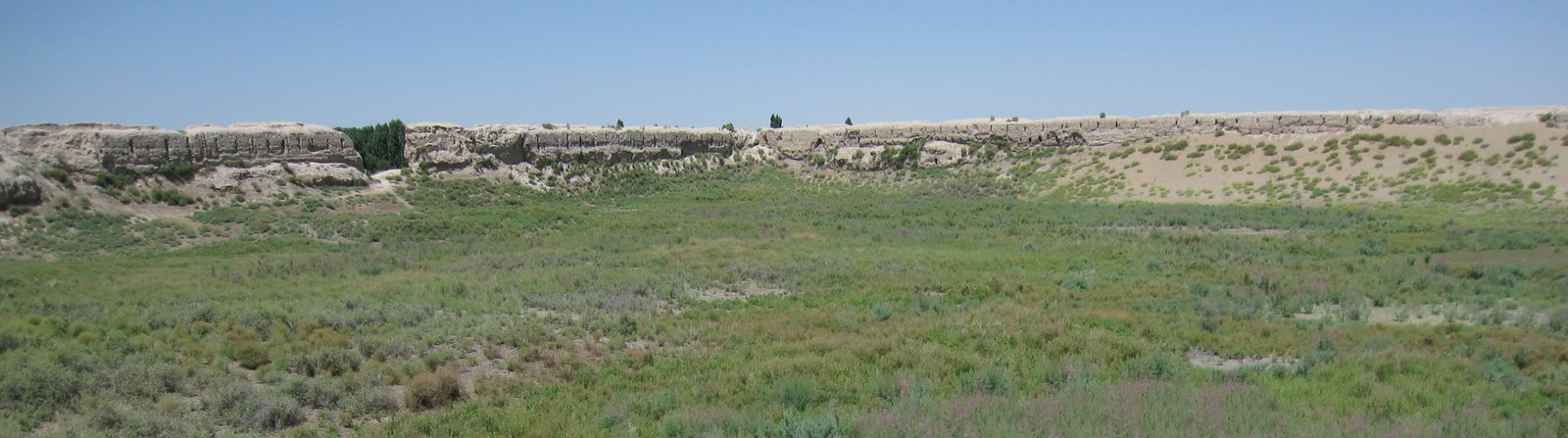
The fortress of Guldursun-Kala was last occupied by Muhammad II of Khwarazm (1169, 1200–20), before it fell to the Mongol conquest of the Khwarazmian Empire.

== See also ==
- Full list of Persian Kingdoms
- Khwarezmia
- List of Sunni Muslim dynasties
