= Zakhireye Khwarazmshahi =

Medical encyclopedia in Persian language

Zakhireye Khwarazmshahi (Persian: ذخیرهٔ خوارزمشاهی Zakhīra-i Khwârazmshâhī, "Treasure Dedicated to the King of Khwarazm" or Treasure of Khwarazmshah), is a Persian medical encyclopedia written by the Persian physician, Ismail Gorgani (1040-1136) in 1110.

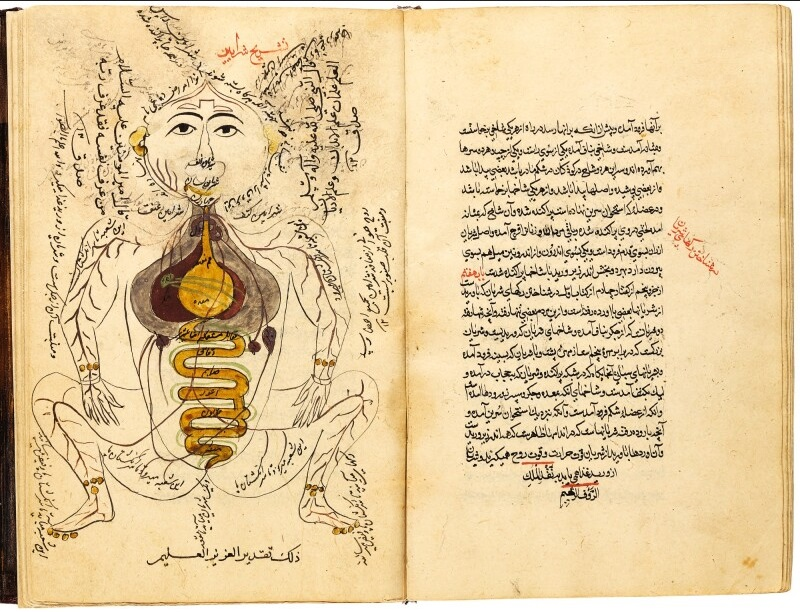
Manuscript of Jurjani's Tashrih Zakhirah-i Khwarazmshahi, vol. I (on anatomy). Copy created in Safavid Iran, dated 1663

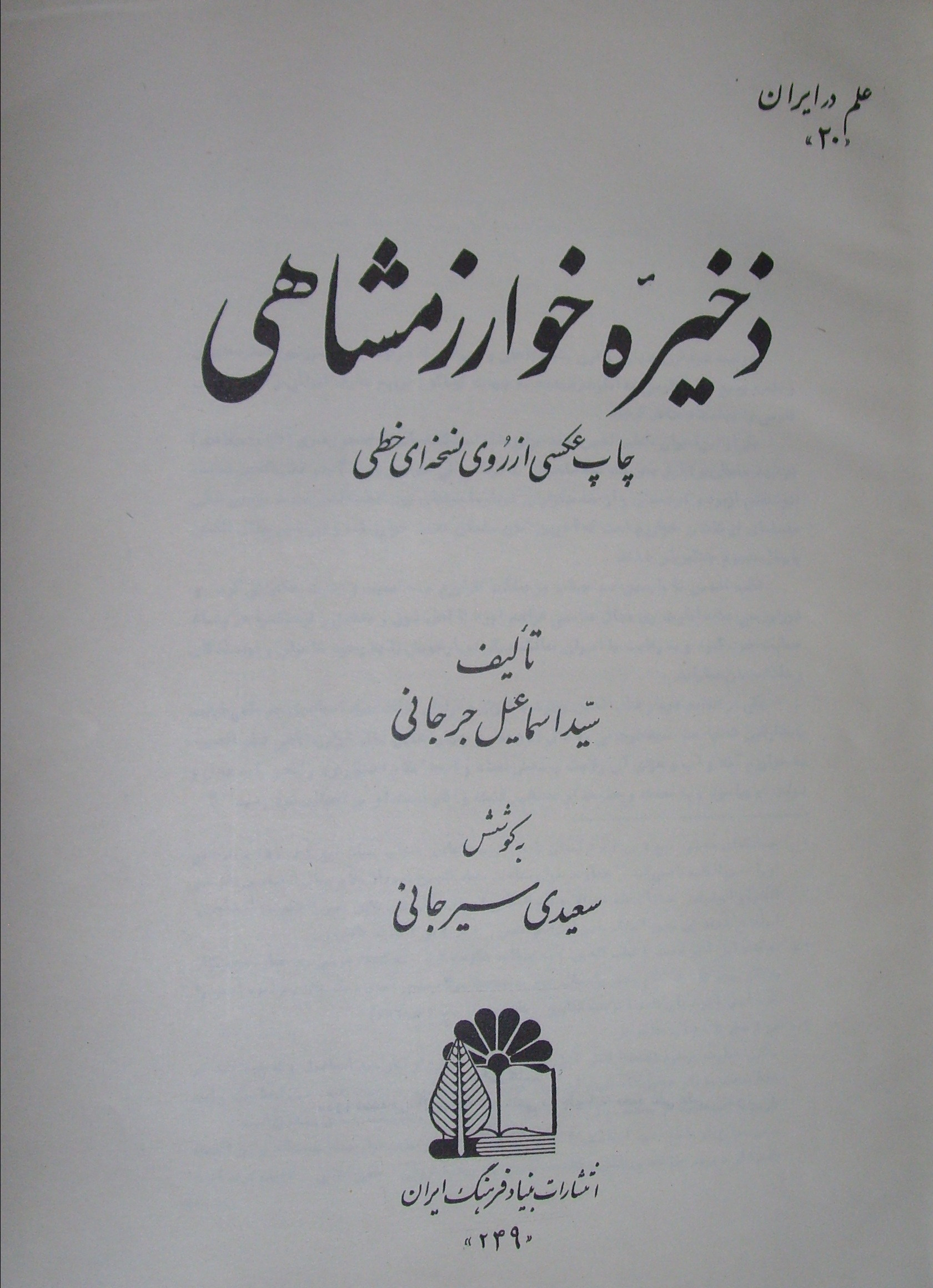
Modern title page of Zakhireye Khwarazmshahi

== Status ==
This Persian medical book is equal in prestige to the famous medical book by Avicenna, which is considered a medical canon. Although the book of Zakhirah-i Khvarazm'Shahi is written in Persian it contains a few Arabic words. The book builds upon works by Avicenna, Akhaveiny, and other doctors of traditional medicine written in the fifth century or before. This Iranian traditional medicinal book has been translated into other languages such as Turkish, Urdu, and Hebrew, and by the author himself into Arabic. After writing this encyclopedic book, Gorgani wrote Khafi Alayee as a contraction of it.

== Provenance ==
At five places in the volume (fols. 75a, 76a, 95a, 98b, and 162b), a later hand in a fine calligraphic script has repeated the following statement: "The owner and possessor of this medical book called Jawahir al-maqal is Khamrah Aghā ibn Rustum ibn Muḥammad Aghā ibn Khiḍr Aghā ibn Mīr Khamrah ibn Mīr Mīzā ibn Aḥmad Beg, in the year 1211 [= 1796–7]." An owner's stamp accompanies these inscriptions. Schullian/Sommer (Cat. of incun. & MSS., p. 338) initially interpreted this name as that of the compiler of the collection, however, the inscription clearly indicates that this is the name of a later owner.

The volume was acquired in 1941 by the Army Medical Library from A.S. Yahuda, who had obtained it in Ebril in northern Iraq (ELS 1685 med 45).

== Contents ==
Zakhira-i Khvarazm'Shahi contains 10 chapters and a preface. The preface describes the ecology of the Khorezm and the foods and nutrition of the people of the Khorezm (now called Khorasan). Chapter one is about the importance of medicine, human anatomy, and general pathophysiology. Chapter two is related to symptoms and signs of the diseases and methods of treatment, sphygmology ("sphygmo" in Greek means pulse), and any liquid material excreted from the body (such as sweat and urine). Chapter three is about the water and weather, nutrition, exercise, emotions, sleep and wakefulness, and methods of treatment for children and the elderly. Chapter four is about the differential diagnoses and course of diseases. Chapter five defines fever categories and natural moisture and its relation with fever. In chapter six, he writes about treatment of any diseases that relate to the head, cervix, and the upper and lower limbs and trunk. In chapter seven of his book, he writes about methods of treatment of different types of wounds, inflammations, oncology, burns by hot water, hot oil and fire, cauterization, and orthopedics. Chapter eight is about diseases that relate to the integument system such as general dermatology, hair pathology, fatness, weight loss and methods of treatment of it. Chapter nine contain topic about the toxins, drugs, animal bites and rabidity, and insects stings. Finally in chapter ten, he writes about the classification of drugs and basic pharmacology, drugs for the ear, eye, nose and mouth, epilepsy, stroke, and pharmacological terminology.
