= Atsiz =

Khwarazmshah from 1127 to 1156

Atsiz اتسز
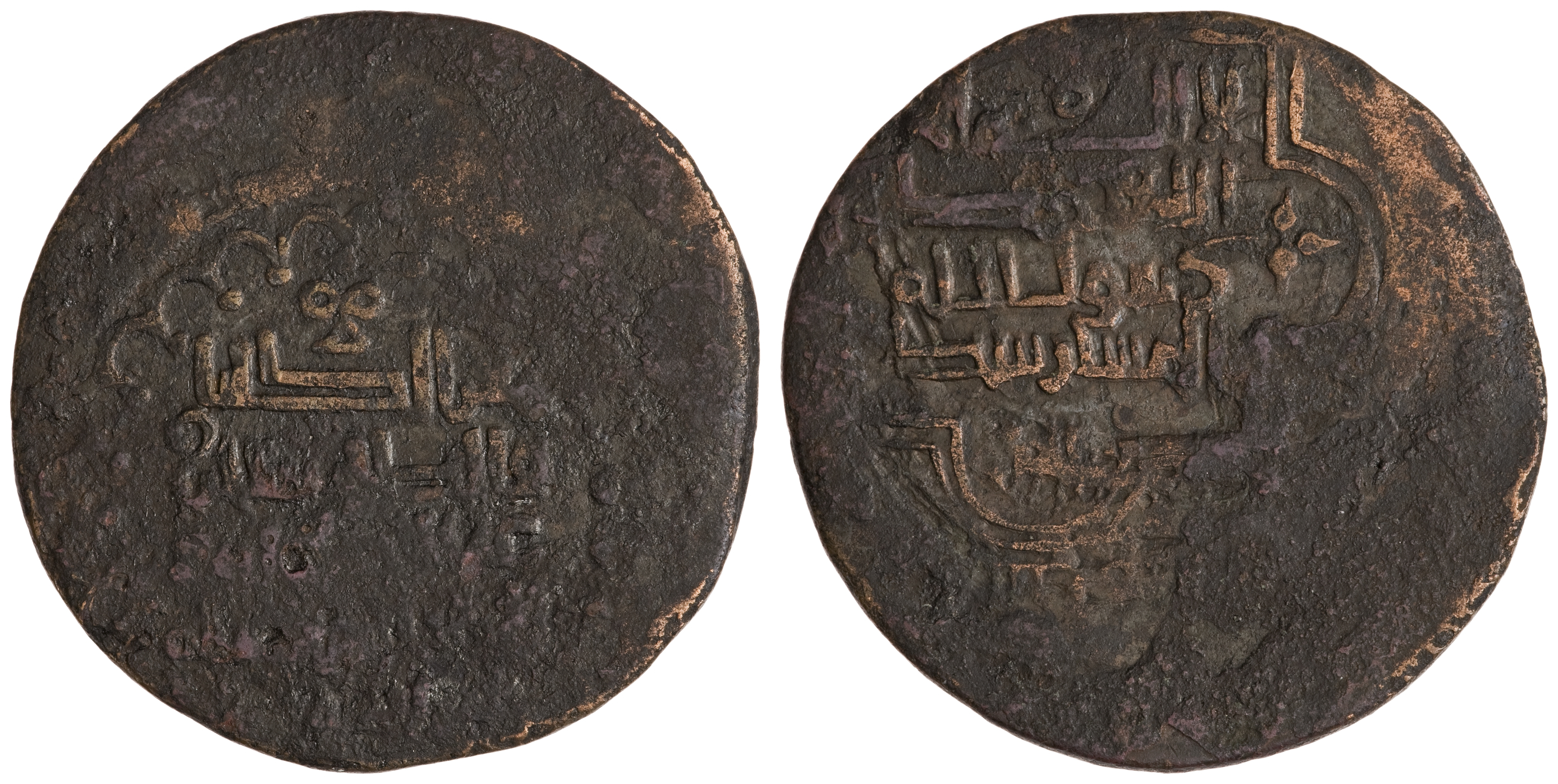
- Coin minted under Atsiz, citing his Seljuk suzerain Ahmad Sanjar

Khwarazmshah
- Reign: 1127 – 30 July 1156
- Predecessor: Muhammad I
- Successor: Il-Arslan
- Born: Konye-Urgench 1098
- Died: 30 July 1156 (aged 58)
- Issue: Il-Arslan; Atliq; Hitan-Khan; Suleiman-Shah
Names
- Ala al-Din wa-l-Dawla Abu'l-Muzaffar Atsiz ibn Muhammad ibn Anushtegin
- Dynasty: Anushtegin
- Father: Muhammad I
- Mother: Kipchak princess (?)
- Religion: Sunni Islam

Ala al-Din wa-l-Dawla Abu'l-Muzaffar Atsiz ibn Muhammad ibn Anushtegin (Persian: علاءالدين و الدوله ابوالمظفر اتسز بن محمد بن انوشتگین; 1098 – 1156), better known as Atsiz (اتسز) was the second Khwarazmshah from 1127 to 1156. He was the son and successor of Muhammad I.

== Ruler of Khwarazm ==
=== Warfare with the Seljuk suzerain ===
Atsïz gained his position following his father's death in 1127 or 1128. During the early part of his reign, he focused on securing Khwarazm against nomad attacks. In 1138, he rebelled openly against his suzerain, the Seljuk Sultan Ahmad Sanjar and conquered the Mangyshlak and lower bank of the Syr Darya, but was defeated in Hazarasp and forced to flee. Sanjar installed his nephew Suleiman Shah as ruler of Khwarazm and returned to Merv. Atsïz returned, however, and Suleiman Shah was unable to hold on to the province. Atsïz then attacked Bukhara and sacked the city before executing the local client governor. Sanjar was conscious of these developments, but was hoping to prevent further conflict.

Atsiz won more successive victories in a campaign in 1139 against the Bavandids under Ali I, an undertaking during which he occupied Gorgan and defeated the provincial ispahbadh, Ala ad-Dawla 'Ali ibn Shahriyar at the Battle of Kabud-Jama, capturing him. He was later released upon pleas of his son, in exchange for Gorgan becoming his vassal.

By 1141 Atsiz, worried about the expansion of the Qara Khitai, again submitted to Sanjar, who pardoned him and formally returned control of Khwarazm over to him, but this alliance quickly grew tenuous as Ahmad Sanjar started to lack his customary composure and skill.

The same year that Sanjar pardoned Atsïz, the Kara Khitai and Karluqs under Yelü Dashi defeated the Seljuks at Qatwan, near Samarkand. Atsïz took advantage of the defeat to invade Khorasan, occupying Merv, Nishapur, and Sarakhs. Yelü Dashi, however, sent a force to plunder Khwarazm, forcing Atsïz to pay an annual tribute.

Later Rule

In 1142, Atsiz was expelled from Khorasan by Sanjar, who invaded Khwarazm in the following year and forced Atsïz back into vassalage, although Atsïz continued to pay tribute to the Kara Khitai until his death. Sanjar undertook another expedition against Atsïz in 1147 when the latter became rebellious again, besieging Atsiz at Hazarasp and forcing him to seek refuge in Gurganj, where he again submitted and was pardoned by Sanjar, who was increasingly apprehensive about the burgeoning Qara Khitai to the North-east.

In 1152, Jand was occupied by a band of the Qara Khitai and they assigned Kamal ad-Din ibn Arslan-Khan Mahmud as the garrison commander. Atsiz marched north and recaptured Jand with little bloodshed in April, imprisong Kamal ad-Din. Atsiz then endowed governorship over Jand to his eldest son, Il-Arslan, who was given the title of wali.

In 1153, Sanjar was defeated and imprisoned by a group of Oghuz tribes, and Khorasan soon descended into anarchy. The portion of the Seljuk army that refused to join the Oghuz proclaimed the former ruler of the Karakhanids, Mahmud Khan, as their leader. Mahmud sought an alliance with Atsïz against the Oghuz, while Atsïz's brother Ïnal-Tegin had already plundered a part of Khorasan in 1154. Atsïz and his son Il-Arslan departed from Khwarazm, but before they could make any gains Sanjar escaped from his captivity and restored his rule.

== Death ==
Atsïz died in 1156 and was succeeded by Il-Arslan.

== Evaluation of reign ==
Atsiz was a flexible politician and ruler, and was able to maneuver between the powerful Sultan Sanjar and equally powerful Yelü Dashi. He continued the land-gathering policy initiated by his predecessors, annexing Jand and Mangyshlak to Khwarazm. Many nomadic tribes were dependent on the Khwarazmshah. Towards the end of his life, Atsiz subordinated the entire northwestern part of Central Asia, and in fact, achieved its independence from the neighbors.

== Culture ==
Contrary to the early Seljuk rulers, the first Khwarazmshahs were literate. The Khwarazmian grammarian and lexicographer al-Zamakhshari dedicated his Arabic dictionary of Muqaddimat al-adab to Atsiz. Ata-Malik Juvayni and Aufi praised Atsiz for his literacy and expertise in writing Persian poetry. Atsiz is often addressed in the panegyric qasidas of his poet laureate and chief secretary Rashid al-Din Vatvat (died 1182/3).

== Sources ==
- Biran, Michal (2005). The Empire of the Qara Khitai in Eurasian History: Between China and the Islamic World. Cambridge Studies in Islamic Civilization. Cambridge, England: Cambridge University Press. ISBN 978-0521842266.
- Bosworth, Clifford Edmund (1968). "The Political and Dynastic History of the Iranian World (A.D. 1000–1217)". In Boyle, John Andrew (ed.). The Cambridge History of Iran: The Saljuq and Mongol Periods. Vol. 5. Cambridge: Cambridge University Press. pp. 1–202. ISBN 0-521-06936-X.
- Bosworth, Clifford Edmund (1978). "K̲h̲wārazm-S̲h̲āhs". In van Donzel, E.; Lewis, B.; Pellat, Ch. & Bosworth, C. E. (eds.). The Encyclopaedia of Islam, Second Edition. Volume IV: Iran–Kha. Leiden: E. J. Brill. ISBN 978-90-04-05745-6. OCLC 758278456.
- Bosworth, Clifford Edmund (2008). "Khwarazmshahs i. Descendants of the line of Anuštigin". In Yarshater, Ehsan (ed.). Encyclopædia Iranica. Vol. XIV: Isfahan IX–Jobbāʾi. London and New York: Routledge & Kegan Paul. ISBN 978-1-934283-08-0.
- Boyle, J. A. . The Cambridge History of Iran Volume 5: The Saljuq and Mongol Periods. Cambridge, UK: Cambridge University Press, 1968.
- Chalisova, Natalia (2000). "Waṭwāṭ, Rašid-al-Din". Encyclopædia Iranica, online edition. New York.
- Grousset, René (1970). The Empire of the Steppes: A History of Central Asia. Rutgers University Press. ISBN 978-0-8135-1304-1.
- Morgan, David; Stewart, Sarah, eds. (2017). The Coming of the Mongols. Bloomsbury Publishing. ISBN 978-1788312851.
- Paul, Jürgen (2015). "Atsız b. Muḥammad". In Fleet, Kate; Krämer, Gudrun; Matringe, Denis; Nawas, John; Rowson, Everett (eds.). Encyclopaedia of Islam (3rd ed.). Brill Online. ISSN 1873-9830.

Preceded by Qutb ad-Din Muhammad	Shah of Khwarazm; 1127/8–1156	Succeeded by Il-Arslan
