= Ekinchi (Khwarazm Shah) =

Governor of Khwarazm
- In office 1097
- Preceded by: Anushtegin Gharchai
- Succeeded by: Muhammad I

Personal details
- Died: 1097

Ekinchi ibn Qochar (died 1097) was the Seljuk governor of Khwarazm briefly in 1097, bearing the traditional title of Khwarazmshah. Unlike the Khwarazmshahs that succeeded him, he was not a descendant of Anushtegin Gharchai.

Following the death of Anushtegin, Ekinchi was given the position of Khwarazmshah by the Seljuk Sultan Berkyaruq. After a short period of time, however, he was killed by several Seljuk amirs who had risen in revolt. After he died, he was replaced by Anushtegin's son, Qutb al-Din Muhammad.

Ekinchi literally means "farmer" or "ploughman" in Turkic languages.

Preceded by Anushtegin Gharchai	Governor of Khwarazm; 1097	Succeeded by Muhammad I
