= Wives of Genghis Khan =

After Börte's final childbirth, Genghis Khan began to acquire a number of subsequent secondary wives through conquest. These wives had all previously been princesses or queens, and Temüjin married them to demonstrate his political ascendancy. Khan gave several of his high-status wives their own ordos or domestic yurts to live in and manage. The children of the secondary wives were always subservient to those of Börte, with daughters married off to seal lesser alliances and sons, such as Qulan's child Kölgen, never a candidate for succession. It was the job of the Kheshig (Mongol imperial guard) to protect the yurts of Genghis Khan's families. When Genghis Khan set out on his military conquests, he usually took his latest wife with him and left the remaining wives (and concubines) to manage the empire in his absence.

== Börte (chief first wife) ==
The marriage between Börte and Genghis Khan (then known as Temüjin) was arranged by her father and Yesügei, Temüjin's father, when she was 10 and he was 9 years old. Temüjin stayed with her and her family until he was called back to take care of his mother and younger siblings, due to the poisoning of Yesügei by Tatar nomads. In 1178, about 7 years later, Temüjin traveled downstream along the Kelüren River to find Börte. When Börte's father saw that Temüjin had returned to marry Börte, he had the pair "united as man and wife". With the permission of her father, Temüjin took Börte and her mother to live in his family yurt. Börte's dowry was a fine black sable jacket. Soon after the marriage took place, the Three Merkits attacked their family camp at dawn and kidnapped Börte. She was given to one of their warriors as a spoil of war. Temüjin was deeply distressed by the abduction of his wife and remarked that his "bed was made empty" and his "breast was torn apart". Temüjin rescued her several months later with the aid of his allies Wang Khan and Jamukha. Many scholars describe this event as one of the key crossroads in Temüjin's life, which moved him along the path towards becoming a conqueror.

"As the pillaging and plundering went on, Temüjin moved among the people that were hurriedly escaping, calling, ‘Börte, Börte!’ And so he came upon her, for Lady Börte was among those fleeing people. She heard the voice of Temüjin and, recognizing it, she got off the cart and came running towards him. Although it was still night, Lady Börte and Qo’aqčin both recognized Temüjin's reins and tether and grabbed them. It was moonlight; he looked at them, recognized Lady Börte, and they fell into each other's arms." -The Secret History of the Mongols

Börte was held captive for eight months, and gave birth to Jochi soon after she was rescued. This left doubt as to who the father of the child was, because her captor took her as a "wife" and could have possibly impregnated her. Despite this, Temüjin let Jochi remain in the family and claimed him as his own son. Börte had three more sons, Chagatai (1183–1242), Ögedei (1186–1241), and Tolui (1191–1232). Temüjin had many other children with other wives, but they were excluded from the succession, and only Börte's sons could be considered to be his heirs. Börte was also the mother to several daughters, Qojin, Checheikhen, Alakhai Bekhi, Tümelün, and Altalun. However, the poor survival of Mongol records means it is unclear whether she gave birth to all of them.

== Secondary wives after final childbirth ==
=== Yesugen ===
During his military campaign against the Tatars, Temüjin took Yesugen as a wife. She was the daughter of a Tatar leader named Yeke Cheren that Temüjin's army had killed during battle. After the military campaign against the Tatars was over, Yesugen, one of the survivors, went to Temüjin, who slept with her. According to the Secret History of the Mongols, while they were having sex Yesugen asked Temüjin to treat her well and to not discard her. When Temüjin seemed to agree with this, Yesugen recommended that he also marry her sister Yesui.

Being loved by him, Yisügen Qatun said, 'If it pleases the Qa’an, he will take care of me, regarding me as a human being and a person worth keeping. But my elder sister, who is called Yisüi, is superior to me: she is indeed fit for a ruler.'

— The Secret History of The Mongols

Both the Tatar sisters, Yesugen and Yesui, became Temüjin's principal wives and were given their own camps to manage. Temüjin also took a third woman from the Tatars, an unknown concubine.

=== Yesui ===
At the recommendation of her sister Yesugen, Temüjin had his men track down and kidnap Yesui. When she was brought to Temüjin, he found her every bit as pleasing as promised and so he married her. The other wives, mothers, sisters and daughters of the Tatars had been parceled out and given to Mongol men. The Tatar sisters, Yesugen and Yesui, were two of Genghis Khan's most influential wives. Genghis Khan took Yesui with him when he set out on his final expedition against the Tangut Empire. When he fell ill, Yesui administered the government to hide his condition. Like the other wives of Genghis Khan, she had her own ordo, or court and to her was assigned the Tuul River.

=== Khulan ===
Khulan entered Mongol history when her father, the Merkit leader Dayir Usan, surrendered to Temüjin in the winter of 1203–04 and gave her to him. But, at least according to the Secret History of the Mongols, Khulan and her father were detained by Naya'a, one of Temüjin's officers, who was apparently trying to protect them from Mongol soldiers who were nearby. After they arrived three days later than expected, Temüjin suspected that Naya'a was motivated by his carnal feelings towards Khulan to help her and her father. While Temüjin was interrogating Naya'a, Khulan spoke up in his defense and invited Temüjin to have sex with her and inspect her virginity personally, which pleased him.

In the end, Temüjin accepted Dayir Usan's surrender and Khulan as his new wife. However, Dayir Usan later retracted his surrender, but he and his subjects were eventually subdued, his possessions plundered, and he himself killed. Temüjin continued to carry out military campaigns against the Merkits until their final dispersal in 1218. Khulan was able to achieve meaningful status as one of Temüjin's wives and managed one of the large wifely camps, in which other wives, concubines, children and animals lived. She gave birth to a son named Gelejian, who went on to participate with Börte's sons in their father's military campaigns.

=== Möge Khatun ===
Möge Khatun was a concubine of Genghis Khan and she later became a wife of his son Ögedei Khan. The Persian historian Ata-Malik Juvayni records that Möge Khatun "was given to Chinggis Khan by a chief of the Bakrin tribe, and he loved her very much." Ögedei favored her as well and she accompanied him on his hunting expeditions. She is not recorded as having any children.

=== Juerbiesu ===
Juerbiesu was the empress of both the Mongol Empire and the Naiman people. She was renowned for her beauty across the plains. Originally a favoured concubine of Inanch Bilge Khan, she became the consort of his son, Tayang Khan, after his death. As Tayang Khan was an ineffective ruler, Juerbiesu held almost all the power in Naiman politics.

She had a daughter named Princess Hunhu (渾忽公主) with Yelü Zhilugu, the ruler of Liao. After Genghis Khan destroyed the Naiman tribe and Tayang Khan was killed, Juerbiesu made several offensive remarks regarding Mongols, describing their clothes as dirty and smelly. Yet, she abruptly rescinded her claims and visited Genghis Khan's tent alone. He questioned her about the remarks, but was immediately attracted to her beauty. After spending the night with him, Juerbiesu promised to serve him well and he took her as one of his empresses. Her status was only inferior to Khulan and Börte.

=== Ibaqa Beki ===
Ibaqa was the eldest daughter of the Kerait leader Jakha Gambhu, who allied with Genghis Khan to defeat the Naimans in 1204. As part of the alliance, Ibaqa was given to Genghis Khan as a wife. She was the sister of Begtütmish, who married Genghis Khan's son Jochi, and Sorghaghtani Beki, who married Genghis Khan's son Tolui. After about two years of childless marriage, Genghis Khan abruptly divorced Ibaqa and gave her to the general Jürchedei, a member of the Uru'ut clan and who had killed Jakha Gambhu after the latter turned against Genghis Khan. The exact reason for this remarriage is unknown: According to The Secret History of the Mongols, Genghis Khan gave Ibaqa to Jürchedei as a reward for his service in wounding Nilga Senggum in 1203 and, later, in killing Jakha Gambhu. Conversely, Rashid al-Din in Jami' al-tawarikh claims that Genghis Khan divorced Ibaqa due to a nightmare in which God commanded him to give her away immediately, and Jürchedei happened to be guarding the tent. Regardless of the rationale, Genghis Khan allowed Ibaqa to keep her title as Khatun even in her remarriage, and asked that she would leave him a token of her dowry by which he could remember her. The sources also agree that Ibaqa was quite wealthy.

== Other known concubines ==
=== Chaka ===
Chaka was the daughter of Li Anquan of Western Xia. She was given to Genghis Khan in submission to Mongol rule during the campaign of Western Xia.

=== Qiguo ===
Qiquo was the daughter of the Jurchen Jin emperor Wanyan Yongji, married to Genghis Khan in exchange for his relieving of the Mongol siege upon Zhongdu (Beijing) in the Mongol conquest of the Jin dynasty.
