= Al-Altan =

Mongol princess (c. 1196–1246)

- Born: c. 1196
- Died: 1246 (aged approximately 50); Mongol Empire
- Cause of death: Execution
- Spouse: Barchuq Art Tegin
- Dynasty: Chinggisids
- Father: Genghis Khan
- Mother: Börte

Al-Altan (c. 1196 – 1246), also known as Altalun and Altaluqan, was the youngest child and favourite daughter of Genghis Khan, the founder of the Mongol Empire, and Börte, his primary wife. As part of Genghis's policy of marrying his daughters to powerful rulers in exchange for their submission to him, she married Barchuq Art Tegin, the ruler of the wealthy Uyghur people to the southwest, around 1211.

After Genghis died in 1227 and Ögedei Khan, his third son by Börte, ascended to the Mongol throne, it is likely that the Mongol imperial government began to appropriate the territory and taxes of the Uyghurs for themselves. When Ögedei died after an extended drinking binge in 1241, Al-Altan was present—she had probably travelled to her brother's court to defend her Uyghur subjects against the encroachment. She was rumoured to have poisoned Ögedei and remained under suspicion until the accession of her nephew, Güyük Khan, five years later. Shortly afterwards, Al-Altan was put on trial and executed by the general Eljigidei. Accounts of Al-Altan's life and death were heavily suppressed, with official chronicles compelled to excise or obscure potentially troublesome details. The injustice of her death became a major contention during the Toluid Revolution in 1251, during which Eljigidei was executed by Al-Altan's sympathisers in revenge.

== Biography ==
=== Early life and marriage ===
Al-Altan's mother, Börte, was born into the Onggirat tribe, who lived along the Greater Khingan mountain range south of the Ergüne river, in modern-day Inner Mongolia. She married a Mongol (Note: At this point in time, the word "Mongols" only referred to the members of one tribe in northeast Mongolia; because this tribe played a central role in the formation of the Mongol Empire, their name was later used for all the tribes in the Mongolian Plateau.) leader named Temüjin c. 1178 after a seven-year betrothal. Over the next twenty or so years, Börte gave birth to nine children: four sons named Jochi, Chagatai, Ögedei, and Tolui, and five daughters named Qojin, Checheyigen, Alaqa, Tümelün, and Al-Altan, the youngest. After this last birth c. 1196, Temüjin continued to father offspring with other women whom he had married, but they always remained inferior in status to Börte and her children.

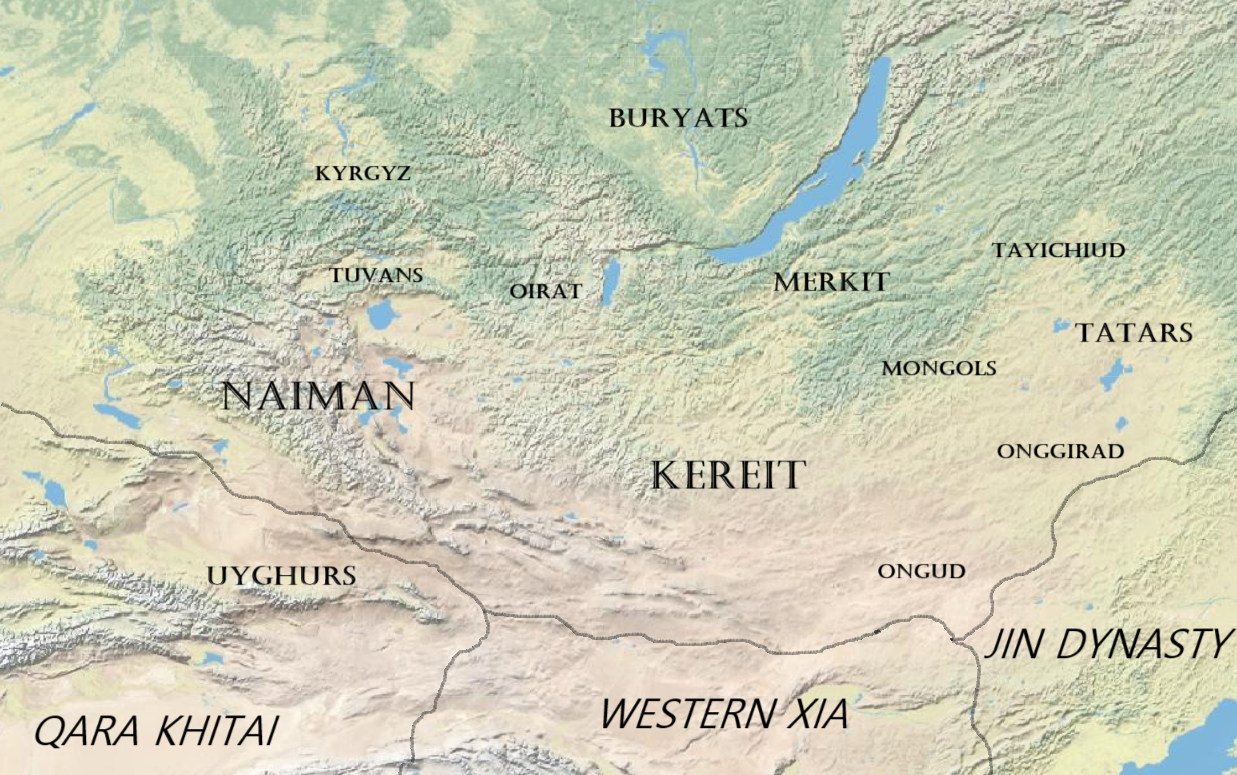
The major tribes of the Mongolian plateau united by Temüjin; the Uyghurs lived outside the Mongol heartland at the southwest corner of the map.

In the decade after Al-Altan's birth, Temüjin steadily increased his power and subjugated rival tribes, a process which culminated in his coronation as Genghis Khan, ruler of the newly-founded Mongol Empire, in 1206. Before and after this acclamation, Genghis employed his daughters with Börte in a crucial role: they were married to important male rulers, who would then submit to Genghis in exchange for rank and power in the new empire. On the other side, Genghis gained the loyalties of large steppe populations without unnecessary bloodshed, and Al-Altan and her sisters took important administrative roles in large tribes. In addition, they served as the link between their father and his new son-in-law vassals. Al-Altan's eldest sister Qojin married Butu of the Ikires tribe, Checheyigen and Alaqa married into the ruling families of the Oirats and Ongud respectively, and Tümelün married back into Börte's Onggirat tribe.

In 1209, Barchuq Art Tegin, the ruler or idiqut (lit. 'lord of fortune') of the wealthy Uyghur people to the southwest of the Mongol heartland, rejected the authority of his suzerain, the Qara Khitai state in Central Asia. Barchuq thereafter sought the friendship and protection of Genghis Khan by sending gifts of gold and jewellery and helping the Mongols pursue some of their Merkit enemies. In 1211, his efforts were rewarded when Genghis named him a "fifth son" and betrothed Al-Altan, then around fifteen, to him. This was a high honour, as Al-Altan was considered Genghis's favourite daughter. In the years thereafter, Barchuq and his 18,000 warriors campaigned as auxiliaries to the main Mongol military in various campaigns, most notably the invasion of the Khwarazmian Empire between 1218 and 1223, where the Uyghurs took part in the sieges of Otrar, Taliqan, and Nishapur. It is unknown if Al-Altan joined the expedition. They also participated in the conquest of the Western Xia state in 1226–27 and in the invasion of Europe in 1236–42. Barchuq died before 1241.

=== Later life and death ===
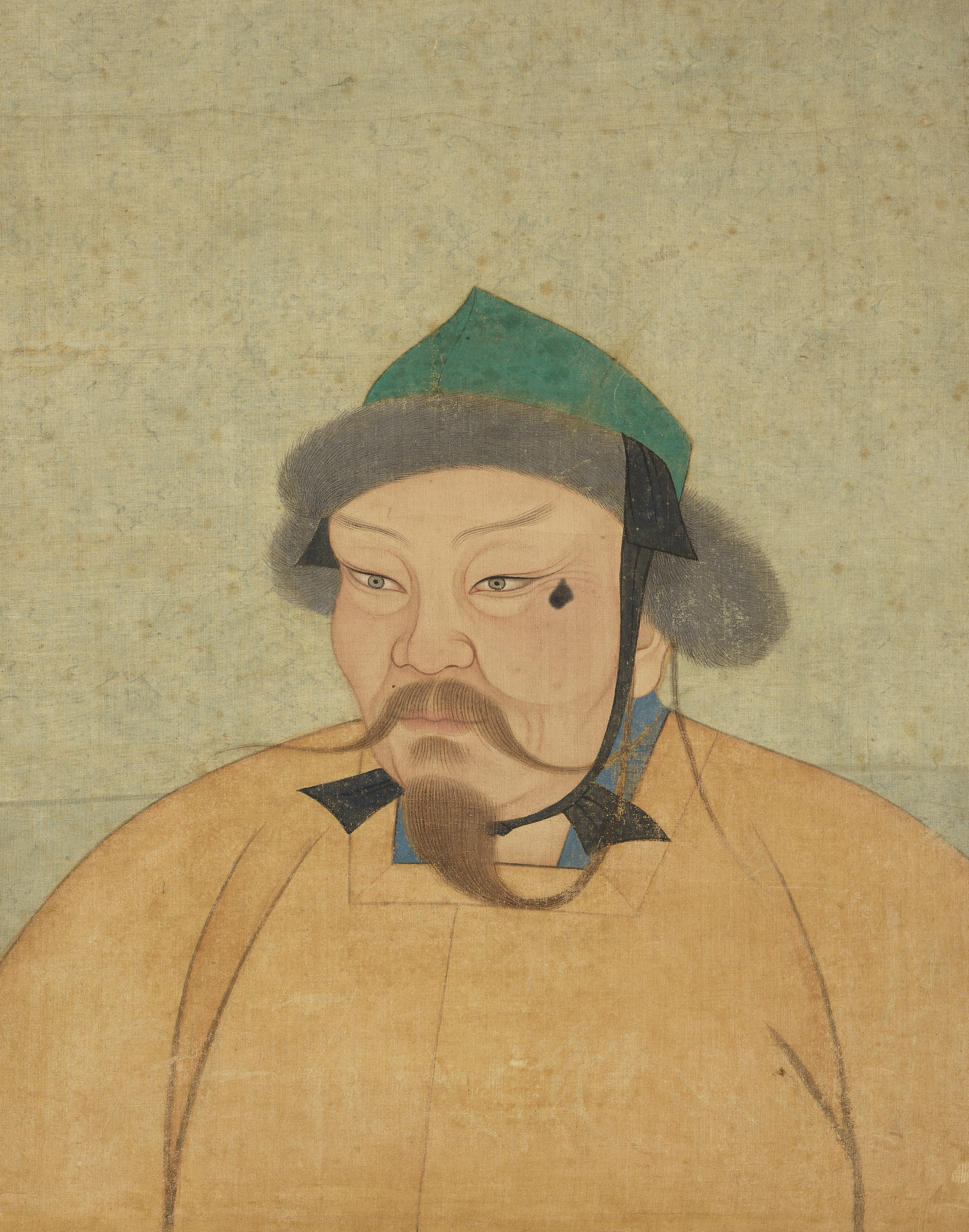
A Yuan dynasty portrait of Ögedei, Al-Altan's brother whom she allegedly poisoned

Genghis died in August 1227 and was succeeded by his chosen heir, Al-Altan's brother Ögedei, after a two-year interregnum. A generous ruler, Ögedei became increasingly addicted to alcohol and died in December 1241 after a wine-fuelled binge resulted in alcohol poisoning or organ failure. Rumours that he had been poisoned began to circulate, directed at two important women who had attended the fatal party. One of them, Ibaqa Beki, a former wife of Genghis, had served as a cupbearer and was immediately under suspicion; she was, however, cleared after being defended by the prominent general Eljigidei. The other was Al-Altan.

Al-Altan must have attended the party to be accused of the crime, but why she was present there and not in the Uyghur lands is not certain. One theory, favoured by historians such as Thomas T. Allsen and Anne F. Broadbridge, hypothesizes that under Ögedei, the Mongols began to interfere with the administration and taxation of the previously semi-autonomous Uyghur state. This process would have increased imperial control at the expense of Al-Altan and her family. Broadbridge argues that Al-Altan may have travelled to Ögedei's court to argue against the imperial encroachment; following her brother's death, his wife Töregene accused Al-Altan of poisoning him in retribution.

Unlike Ibaqa Beki, Al-Altan was never cleared of suspicion. Having survived Töregene's regency between 1241 and 1246, Al-Altan was probably present when her nephew Güyük Khan, son of Ögedei and Töregene, was crowned in the latter year. After his coronation, she was put on trial and executed; all details were heavily suppressed due to the taboo against killing a member of the royal family. An oversight in a medieval chronicle reveals that her executioner was Eljigidei, who had decisively exonerated Ibaqa Beki five years earlier. In return for committing this taboo act, Güyük rewarded Eljigidei with a senior military position in West Asia, distant from any enemies he gained through killing Al-Altan.

=== Aftermath ===
In 1251, Möngke Khan acceded to the throne as part of the Toluid Revolution, in which the family of Genghis's youngest son Tolui seized power from the descendants of Ögedei. Möngke's faction put forward numerous arguments that the house of Ögedei had contravened Mongol law and custom and were thus unfit to rule. The most provocative of these allegations was that they had unlawfully executed Al-Altan, Genghis's favourite daughter, without consulting the wider family. In the purges that began after Möngke foiled an Ögedeyid coup attempt, Eljigidei was singled out as a target, accused of murder by prominent figures such as Batu Khan and Möngke's brother Kublai Khan. He attempted to escape capture but was caught near the city of Herat and soon executed, allegedly being boiled alive on Batu's orders.

During Töregene's regency, Barchuq's successor Kesmes, who was either a son or stepson of Al-Altan, had died of unknown causes. He was replaced with a brother named Salindi, who was personally selected by Töregene and remained extremely loyal to her and Güyük. Salindi remained loyal to the Ögedeyids after the Toluid Revolution but was eventually captured, tortured for a confession, and executed by his brother Ögünch, who replaced him as idiqut.

Because of the taboo nature of her death and the possibility that the Ögedeyids unlawfully interfered in the Uyghur administration, numerous aspects of Al-Altan's life were censored in official chronicles, such as the Secret History of the Mongols. One passage which described the inheritances of Genghis Khan's daughters was excised from the Secret History. This was likely intended to obscure the injustice of the Ögedeyid actions in encroaching on Uyghur territory. Persian sources such as the Jami al-tawarikh, by the 14th-century historian Rashid al-Din, go further by denying that she married Barchuq at all; they instead provide contradictory statements. Suggestions that she married a member of another tribe and then a Uyghur are unlikely, as if a widow remarried, it was normally within her dead husband's tribe. In other places, the Persian sources state that Barchuq and Al-Altan were betrothed but did not marry before Genghis's death because Barchuq had a cherished wife at home—Broadbridge notes that the Mongols would have been deeply insulted. Rashid al-Din then says that Al-Altan died when travelling to marry Barchuq during Ögedei's reign, but later contradicts himself by unintentionally revealing that Eljigidei killed her. Because of these contradictions and improbabilities, Broadbridge considers the Persian narratives untrustworthy.

== See also ==
- Women in the Mongol Empire
