= Checheyigen =

Second daughter of Genghis Khan (c. 1186 – after 1253)

Checheyigen (c. 1186 – after 1253) was the second daughter of Genghis Khan, the founder of the Mongol Empire, and his first wife Börte. As part of Genghis's policy of marrying his daughters to powerful rulers in exchange for their submission, she married a prince of the Oirat tribe, who lived near Lake Baikal, in 1207. There, she assumed a high-ranking administrative role among her husband's people, organising people and flocks like other high-ranking nomadic women. Over the following decades, Checheyigen arranged a series of advantageous marriages for her seven children and, after she backed the successful side in the Toluid Revolution of the early 1250s, her Oirat family became one of the most powerful in the empire. However, her descendants failed to take full advantage of their position, and eventually lost most of their influence.

== Biography ==
=== Background and early life ===
Checheyigen's mother, Börte, was born into the Onggirat tribe, who lived along the Greater Khingan mountain range south of the Ergüne river, in modern-day Inner Mongolia. She married a Mongol (Note: At this point in time, the word "Mongols" only referred to the members of one tribe in northeast Mongolia; because this tribe played a central role in the formation of the Mongol Empire, their name was later used for all the tribes.) leader named Temüjin c. 1178 after a seven-year betrothal. Over the next twenty or so years, Börte gave birth to nine children: four sons named Jochi, Chagatai, Ögedei, and Tolui, and five daughters named Qojin, Checheyigen, Alaqa, Tümelün, and Al-Altan, in order of birth. After her last birth, Temüjin's children came from other women whom he had married, but these always remained inferior in status to Börte and her children.

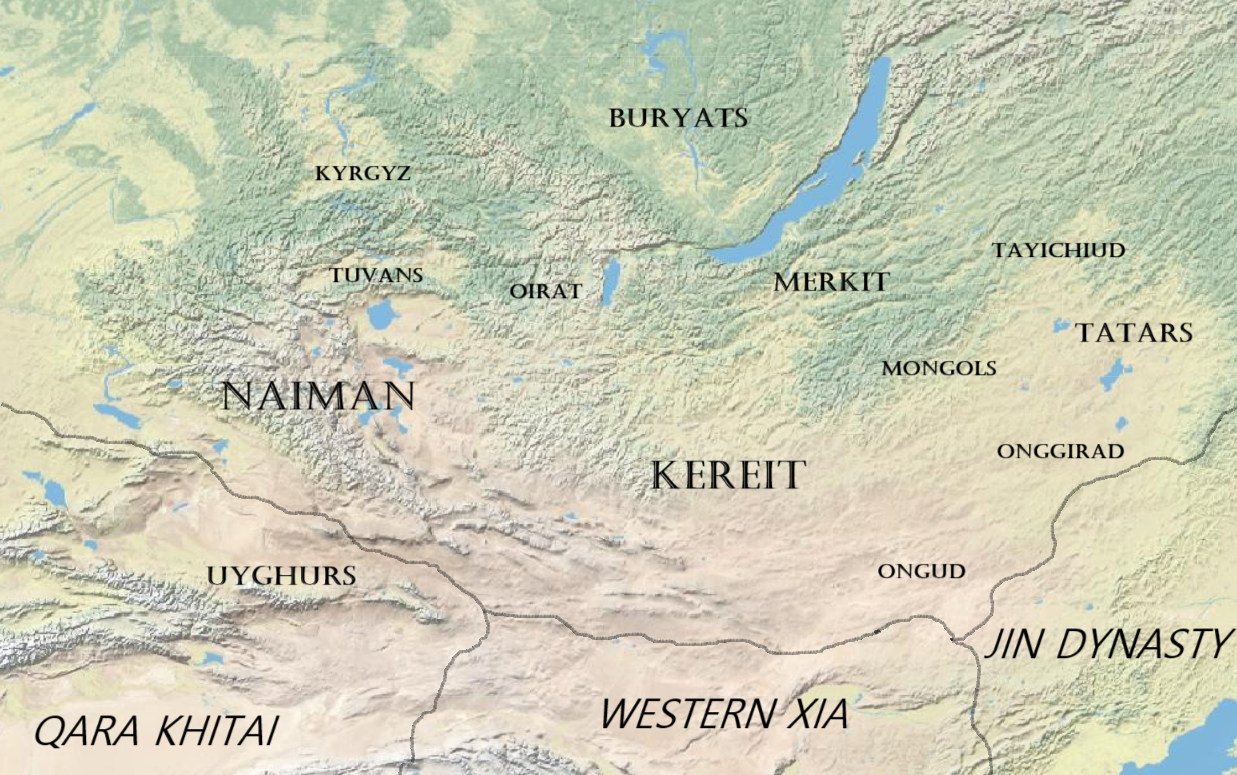
The major tribes of the Mongolian plateau united by Temüjin; the Oirat were located near the centre of the map.

Checheyigen was likely born in late 1187 or 1188, probably after Ögedei and before Alaqa. In the two decades after her birth, Temüjin steadily increased his power and subjugated rival tribes, a process which culminated in him being acclaimed as Genghis Khan, ruler of a new Mongol Empire, in 1206. Before and after this acclamation, Genghis employed his daughters with Börte in a crucial role: they were married to important male rulers, who would then submit to Genghis in exchange for rank and power in the new empire. On the other side, Genghis gained the loyalties of large steppe populations without unnecessary bloodshed, and Checheyigen and her sisters took important administrative roles in large tribes, in addition to serving as the link between their father and his new son-in-law vassals. Checheyigen's eldest sister Qojin married Butu of the Ikires tribe, Al-Altan and Alaqa married into the ruling families of the Uighurs and Ongud respectively, and Tümelün married back into Börte's Onggirat tribe.

=== Marriage ===
In 1207, Genghis dispatched his eldest son Jochi to subdue the Hoi-yin Irgen, a collection of tribes who lived between Lake Baikal and the Urals. One of these tribes was the Oirat, who had previously allied with enemies of Genghis such as Jamukha and the Naiman tribe. Keen to build a more positive relationship with the Mongols, their leader Qutuqa Beki submitted quickly to Jochi and assisted him with subjugating those who would not surrender. The quick compliance of the Oirat tribe influenced other tribes to also submit.

Qutuqa Beki's swift submission ensured he and his tribe gained Genghis Khan's favour. In 1207, Genghis allowed Qutuqa Beki's sons Inalchi and Torolchi to marry two important women of his dynasty: his daughter Checheyigen and Jochi's daughter Qolui. However, it is not certain which husband married which wife. Meanwhile, Checheyigen's brother Tolui married an Oirat princess. The marriages were beneficial for all concerned: Genghis gained the loyalty and territories of the Oirat; Qutuqa Beki became a high-ranking military leader in the new Mongol Empire and retained direct control of his subjects, who served as auxiliaries to the main Mongol military; and Checheyigen assumed a high-ranking administrative role among her husband's people, organising people and flocks like other high-ranking nomadic women. One account records that her father's senior commander Bo'orchu gave her instructions at her wedding:

Listen, Checheyigen Aghai! Because you are the daughter of your Khan father, you are sent to govern the people of the Oirat tribe... Day and night, you should be circumspect all the time. Your words must show your wisdom, you must keep yourself chaste. Leave the things that you have not mastered home, and bring all the things you have mastered with you. You should organize the Oirat people and control them!

Checheyigen and her Oirat husband had seven children: three boys named Buqa Temür, Börtö'ä, and Bars Buqa, and four daughters named Güyük, Orqina, Elchiqmish, and Köchü. In the 1220s and 1230s, Checheyigen looked to marry her daughters back into the Mongol ruling family. Güyük and Elchiqmish married their cousins Hulegu and Ariq Böke, both sons of Tolui. Meanwhile, Orqina and Köchü married grandsons of Checheyigen's brothers Jochi and Chagatai: Qara Hülegü and Toqoqan, respectively. In addition, two of her sons married descendants of Genghis. During this timeframe, Qutuqa Beki and Checheyigen also dispatched Oirat troops to aid in Mongol military campaigns such as the conquest of Russia between 1236 and 1242, and the campaigns of Hulegu in the 1250s.

=== Later life and legacy ===
Checheyigen was still alive as late as 1253. During the Toluid Revolution of the early 1250s, she and the Oirats supported the successful usurper Möngke Khan, the brother of Hulegu and Ariq Böke, with whom they seem to have had an alliance. Her political savvy, both in terms of supporting this coup and her ability to arrange excellent marriages for her many children, ensured that for a time the Oirats were one of the most powerful families in the empire. Most notably, Orqina ruled the Chagatai Khanate as an independent sole regent for more than a decade in the mid-1200s. However, because of unexpected deaths and strong challenges from rival families, Chechiyegen's descendants never gained as much power as was expected, and ended up losing much of their influence.
