= Orda Khan =

Mongol Khan and military strategist (c. 1204 – 1251)

Khan of the Golden Horde Eastern Half (White Horde)
- Reign: 1226–1251
- Predecessor: Jochi
- Successor: Qun Quran
- Born: c. 1204
- Died: 1251
- Issue: Qun Quran
- Dynasty: Borjigin
- Religion: Tengrism

Orda Ichen (c. 1204 – 1251) was a Mongol Khan and military strategist who ruled the eastern part of the Golden Horde during the 13th century.

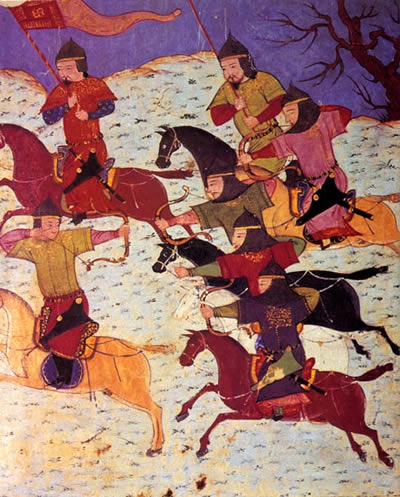
Mongolian Horse Archers

== First Khan of the White Horde ==
Orda Ichen (c. 1204 – 1251) is credited with founding the White Horde; he was the eldest son of Jochi, officially the eldest of Genghis Khan but whose paternity was highly incertain. Orda participated in the massive Mongol invasion of Rus' in 1237–1242. At the death of his father and grandfather, Orda Khan inherited the Eastern portions of his father's lands; while he was the elder, he nevertheless agreed that his younger brother Batu Khan ruled the whole Golden Horde (also known as the Jochid Ulus). This mainly consisted of the territories between Lake Balkhash and the Volga river; it was in these lands that Orda eventually founded the White Horde. West of the Volga river were the lands of his younger brother Batu, who became the first ruler of the Blue Horde and the supreme khan of the Golden Horde.

Güyük Khan ordered Temuge Otchigin, who tried to illegally usurp the throne for himself, to be investigated by Orda and Möngke in c. 1246.

== Family tree origins ==
Hoelun from the Olkhunut subclan of the Onggirat tribe was supposed to marry a Merkit warrior called Yehe Chiledu, but Yesugei Baghatur from the Kiyat tribe abducted Hoelun while she was traveling from the Onggirat to the Merkit. This event triggered hostilities between the Merkit and Kiyat tribes.

Temüjin was born from the marriage between Hoelun and Yesugei. When Temüjin became 16 years old he married Börte Ujin from the Onggirat tribe, the Merkits took revenge by abducting Börte when Temüjin was 18. She was given to Yehe Chiledu's younger brother a warrior named Chilger-Bökö who may have forcibly married her while she was in captivity. Temüjin formed an alliance with his blood brother Jamukha and his foster-father Toghrul, the Merkits were defeated by the alliance which Temüjin had formed and his wife Börte was reclaimed.

Jochi supposedly was born shortly after Börte was liberated and Genghis Khan always accepted Jochi as his first-born son, but to some it remained uncertain whether Temüjin Borjigin or Chilger-Bökö was the real father of Jochi. As Genghis Khan's first-born son, Jochi was favored as rightful heir to the Mongol Empire. It was Chagatai who brought up the dispute of Jochi's illegitimacy, but Genghis Khan remained determined that Jochi was his legitimate first-born son. Jochi's descendants were the oldest branch of the Genghis Khan family, although they were not favored for succession by other rivaling family members.

== Younger brothers ==
Orda Ichen was the first-born son of Jochi. His younger brothers were Batu, Berke, Shayban, Sinkur, Tuqa-Timur and Baul-Teval. After the death of Genghis Khan, the Mongol empire was divided into four sub-khanates. After the invasion of Europe, four other Khanates were established within the empire. These were the princes of the left wing commanded by Orda Khan, the Blue Horde commanded by Batu Khan, the Sibirean Khanate commanded by Shayban and a Khanate on the upper reaches of the Volga river centered on Volga Bulgaria commanded by Toga-Timur (which later became known as the Qasim Khanate). His younger brother, Batu Khan, claimed his authority over the Jochid Hordes in accordance with Orda's wishes.

== Invasion of Poland ==
Subutai and Batu Khan led two armies against Hungary, while Orda Khan with Chagatai's sons Baidar & Kadan attacked Poland as a diversion to prevent the Poles and Czechs from assisting Hungary in combat. Orda's forces assaulted the southwestern border of Lithuania, then sacked the cities of Sandomierz and Kraków in April 1241, but were unable to conquer Wrocław (Breslau), the capital of Lower Silesia. While Orda was preparing a siege on Wrocław, Baidar and Kadan received reports that king Wenceslaus I of Bohemia was two days away with an army of 50,000 soldiers. Orda Khan broke off the siege and turned to Legnica. There, he intercepted the military forces of Henry II the Pious before they could merge with the forces of king Wenceslaus I.

Orda's deployment of 20,000 mounted archers demonstrated speed and tactical superiority versus the slower more heavily armored European armies. A series of deceptive Mongolian attacks separated the Polish formation, making them vulnerable to salvoes of Mongolian arrows. A smoke screen was used to conceal Mangudai's feigned retreat, thereby misleading Henry's forces. When the European knights pursued the supposedly retreating Mangudai, the Mongols were able to separate the knights from the infantry and defeated them one by one. Henry II the Pious was intercepted while trying to escape the battlefield. His head was paraded on a spear through the town of Legnica.

King Wenceslaus I of Bohemia arrived at the battlefield too late. When he heard that one Mongol group raided as far as the Saxonian town Meissen (Mongol raid on Meissen, Germany), he promptly marched there and sought reinforcements from Thuringia and Saxony. Meanwhile, rapid Mongol troops returned to the East (i.e. Central Silesia) and tried to attack Bohemia via Kłodzko Land, but they were stopped at the border. Afterwards Orda, with Mangudai, joined the forces of Kadan and Baidar at Otmuchów (Otmachau). Together, they quickly passed through Moravia (which was severely looted and devastated), joining with the main Mongolian army in Hungary around the city of Esztergom.

== Death ==
Orda Khan died in 1251 before he could consolidate his ülüs (district). After his death his grandson Köchü extended the line of successors for the White Horde.

=== Descendants ===
Very little is known about Orda's wife and children, however his dynastic lines lived on for many generations. His early successors were friendly towards Ilkhanate and Yuan emperors.

==== Children ====
- Quremsa, was a third son of Orda Khan and grandson of Juchi. He is mentioned by Giovanni da Pian del Carpine in his Ystoria Mongalorum as one of lords of Pontic steppes along with Moucy.
- Khuli, who accompanied Hulegu in his Nizari campaign

== See also ==
- List of Mongol rulers
- List of khans of the Golden Horde

== Sources ==
- Atwood, Christopher P. (2004). Encyclopedia of Mongolia and the Mongol Empire. New York: Facts on File. ISBN 978-0-8160-4671-3.

Orda Khan House of Borjigin (1206–1634)
Regnal titles
Preceded by Jochi (Golden Horde)	Khan of the White Horde; 1226 – c. 1251	Succeeded by Qun Quran
