= Qun Quran =

Khan of the White Horde from 1251 to 1280

Khan of the Golden Horde Eastern Half (White Horde)
- Reign: 1251–1280
- Predecessor: Orda Khan
- Successor: Köchü
- Died: 1280
- Dynasty: Borjigin
- Religion: Tengrism

Qun-Quran or Qun-Qiran (r. 1251 – c. 1280) was the khan of the White Horde, left wing of the Golden Horde.

According to Jami al-Tawarikh ("Compendium of Chronicles") by Rashid-al-Din Hamadani, Qun-Quran was the fourth son of Orda, the eldest son of Jochi.

In 1256, a contingent of the Golden Horde under Qun Quran's eldest brother Kuli dispatched in Persia to assist Hulagu. Sometime after the Siege of Baghdad (1258), Kuli died in uncertain circumstances which constrained the Jochids' relationship with the Ilkhanate. During his rule, some descendants of Orda supported the election of Ariq Böke and sided with him in the Toluid Civil War against Kublai in the early 1260s.

When he died, he left no male heir. Therefore, his nephew Köchü succeeded him.

== Genealogy ==
- Genghis Khan
- Jochi
- Orda Khan
- Qun-Quran

== See also ==
- List of khans of the Golden Horde

Qun Quran House of Borjigin (1206-1635)
Regnal titles
Preceded by Orda Khan	Khan of the White Horde; 1251 – c. 1280	Succeeded by Köchü
