= Barchuq Art Tegin =

Ruler of the Qocho

Barchuq Art Tegin (Chinese: 巴而朮·阿而忒·的斤, Uyghur: بارچۇق ئارت تېكىن, known also as Idikut Baurchuk, Idikut Barchuq) was a ruler, with a title of Idiqut ("Lord of happiness"), of the Qocho in Beshbalik (near present-day Ürümqi, China), Kara-Khoja (near present-day Turpan, China, known also as Idikut-Shahri), Kumul, Kucha and Karasahr between 1208 and 1235. As a result of his policies, Uyghuria joined the Mongol Empire as its fifth Ulus (district) in 1211.

In 1209, Baurchuk sparked a rebellion against the Western Liao dynasty, who had forced the Uyghurs into paying tribute. He killed the Gurkhan's envoy Shaukam and sent an embassy to Genghis Khan, asking for his help. The Mongol ruler accepted Baurchuk's deputation and pledged his support.

During the following year or two, Baurchuk mounted military expeditions against Naimans and killed four sons of their ruler Tayang Khan. After this show of loyalty to Genghis Khan, he was received by the latter in modern-day Mongolia (1211), married his daughter Altun Begi and was declared by Genghis Khan to be his fifth son, after Jochi, Chagatay, Ögedei and Tolui.

In September 1219, Baurchuk joined Genghis Khan in an attack against the Khwarezmian Empire, personally commanding a tuman (10,000 soldiers) and taking part in the siege of Otrar and Nishapur (razed to ground by Mongols). In the spring of 1226, he took an active part in the two-year Mongol expedition against the Western Xia led by Genghis Khan himself and completed in almost full annihilation of the Tangut people, who were declared to be responsible for Genghis Khan's death under the walls of besieged Tangut capital, in September 1227. Baurchuk's participation in the expedition for destruction of the Tangut state was motivated not only by his obligations as ally of the Mongols, but also by the enmity that existed between the Tanguts and the Uyghurs since the destruction of the Buddhist/Manichaean Uyghur Kingdom in Gansu (848–1036) two centuries before, during the Uyghur-Tangut war of 1028–1036, followed by mass killings of its inhabitants. The population of the Western Xia was reduced from around 3,000,000 people to less than one hundred thousand, which eventually had been assimilated by other ethnic groups, mostly of Mongolic, Turkic and Tibetan origins.

The present Tungan (Hui) people of autonomous Ningxia region can be considered as descendants of the Tangut people. The name Ningxia in Chinese means "Tranquillized or Quelled Xia".

== Descendants of Baurchuk ==
- Üsen temür（月仙帖木兒/yuèxiān tièmùér）
  - Barǰuq art tigin（巴而朮阿而忒的斤/bāérzhú āértè dejīn, بارجق/bārjūq）(1209-1235)
    - Kišmain（کیشماین/kīshmāīn）(1235-1245)
    - Salandi（سالندی/sālandī）(1245-1255)
    - Ögrünč tigin（玉古倫赤的斤/yùgǔlúnchì dejīn, اوکنج/ūknchī）(1255-1257)
      - Mamuraq tigin（馬木剌的斤/mǎmùlà dejīn）(1257-1266)
        - Qočqar or Khochqar tigin（火赤哈兒的斤/huǒchìhāér dejīn）(1266-1276)
          - Nigürin tigin（紐林的斤/niǔlín dejīn）(1276-1318)
            - Temür buqa（帖睦爾普化/tièmùěr pǔhuà）?-1327)
              - Budaširi（不答失里/bùdáshīlǐ）?
                - Qošang（和賞/héshǎng）?
            - Sengki tigin（籛吉/jiānjí）(?-1331)
            - Taypinu tigin（太平奴/tàipíngnú）(1331-1335)
            - ？Ürük temür or Chin Temur（月魯帖木兒/yuèlǔ tièmùér）……Father is unknown.(1335-1353)
              - Sangga（桑哥/sānggē）?
          - Qipčaqtai（欽察台/qīnchátái）?
          - Il yïγmïš begi（也立亦黒迷失別吉/yělì yìhēimíshī biéjí）?
          - Sösök tigin（雪雪的斤/xuěxuě dejīn）?
            - Dorǰi tigin（朵兒的斤/duǒér dejīn）?
              - Bayan buqa tigin（伯顏不花的斤/bǎiyán bùhuā dejīn）?
