= Yesugen =

Tatar noblewoman and wife of Genghis Khan

- Spouse: Genghis Khan
- Issue: Cha'ur
Era dates
- Early 13th century
- House: Borjigin
- Father: Yeke Cheren

Yesugen (Mongolian: Есүгэн) was one of the wives of Genghis Khan, the founder of the Mongol Empire. She was of Tatar ancestry. Her elder sister Yesui also subsequently became a wife of Genghis Khan. During his military campaign against the Tatars, Genghis Khan fell in love with Yesugen and took her in as a wife. She was, along with Yesui, the daughter of Yeke Cheren, a Tatar leader executed by the Mongol forces.

“Being loved by him, Yisügen Qatun said, ‘If it pleases the Qa’an, he will take care of me, regarding me as a human being and a person worth keeping. But my elder sister, who is called Yisüi, is superior to me: she is indeed fit for a ruler.’ ” -The Secret History of The Mongols

Despite her willingness to be married to Genghis Khan, Yesugen declared that her older sister, Yesui, was “superior” to her. Genghis Khan searched for and found Yesui, and Yesugen yielded her position to her sister. To Yesugen were assigned the Khangai Mountains as territory. Like his other wives, Yesugen had her own ordo, or court. However, she did not wield the same power or influence as his first wife Börte. She birthed at least one child for Genghis Khan, a son named Cha'ur. Cha'ur, however, did not live to adulthood.

== Sources ==
- Weatherford, Jack. (2010). The Secret History of the Mongol Queens. Broadway Paperbacks, New York.
