= Qojin =

Daughter of Genghis Khan

- Born: c. 1179
- Consort of: Butu
- Issue: Temegen; Uladai
- Dynasty: Borjigin; Ikires
- Father: Genghis Khan
- Mother: Börte

Qojin (Mongolian: Хожин; c. 1179 – ?) was the eldest child and daughter of Genghis Khan, the founder of the Mongol Empire, and his primary wife, Börte. She married a member of the Ikires tribe, Butu, and had children with him.

== Biography ==
Qojin was likely born in either 1179 or 1180, as the eldest child and daughter of Temüjin, later known as Genghis Khan, and his wife Börte, who at the time would have been 18 or 19 years old. Qojin had eight younger siblings: Jochi, Chagatai, Ögedei, Checheyigen, Alaqa, Tümelün, Tolui, and Al-Altan.

Temüjin had a strong relationship with Toghrul, helping him reclaim rule over the Kerait tribe in the 1190s. As Temüjin's power grew to nearly equal that of Toghrul's, their relationship required adjustment. Toghrul proposed that he adopt Temüjin as his heir, while Temüjin proposed that Qojin and Jochi marry Toghrul's grandson Tusaqa and daughter Cha'ur, respectively. Qojin was around 23 years old when this proposal occurred, making her older than usual for a bride of the time period. However, Toghrul's son Senggüm, who feared that Temüjin would usurp his own authority, convinced his father to not only reject the proposal but also to attack Temüjin. Senggüm argued that the marriages would relegate Cha'ur to the place of a servant among the Mongols while designating Qojin an honoured lady among the Kerait, a claim which disguised his greater fear of Temüjin's growing power.

Qojin eventually married Butu of the Ikires tribe, a follower of Temüjin who had remained loyal in the difficult times after Senggüm's attack. Butu had previously been married to Qojin's paternal aunt Temülün, who had died of unknown causes. Their marriage took place after 1203 but before 1206. The strategic marriage gave her father a son-in-law with 2,000 troops to participate in military excursions. In return, Butu retained the right to lead his own Ikires people on campaign (most Mongol military units were composed of troops from different tribes).

Qojin became the matriarch of the Ikires. She had at least two sons with Butu: Temegen, who married one of Genghis Khan's junior daughters, and Uladai, whose daughter Qutuqtai became the senior wife of Möngke Khan.
