= Dei Sechen =

12th century Khongirad ruler, a father of Börte

- Chief of the Khongirad
- Tenure: 12th–13th Centuries
- Successor: Anchen
- Full name: Dei Sechen Bosqur
- Born: Khamag Mongol Khanate (Present Mongolia)
- Died: Mongolia
- Family: Bosqur Clan
- Wife: Čotan
- Children: Anchen; Qogu; Börte
- Religion: Tengrism

Dei Sechen (Mongolian: ᠳᠡᠢ ᠰᠡᠴᠡᠨ, romanized: Dei Sečen, Chinese: 特薛禪; pinyin: Tè Xuēchán) was the chief of Mongol Khongirat tribe's Bosqur clan (Chinese: 孛思忽兒; pinyin: Bèisīhūer) in 12th–13th centuries. His daughter Börte was the first and principal wife of Genghis Khan.

According to The Secret History of the Mongols Temujin was betrothed to Börte when he was 9 years old by Yesugei and Dei, when Yesugei was looking for a bride for his son. Yesugei put his son in care of Dei Sechen and returned to his tribe, only to be poisoned on the road during a lunch by Tatars. However, according to Rashid al-Din, Dei Sechen wasn't happy with betrothal, it was his son Anchen (按陳) who facilitated the process. Japanese researcher Mako Fujii argued that Dei Sechen was involved in Yesugei's death.

Later, when Temujin grew up, he still married his betrothed Börte. Part of her dowry was a luxurious black marten, which Temujin later presented to Toghrul, thus enlisting the support of the Keraites.

== Descendants ==
He had a spouse named Chotan who bore his sons Anchen and Qogu and his daughter Börte. His descendants married into ruling Borjigin family, producing imperial son-in-laws and empresses.
