= Women in the Mongol Empire =

Women were important members of the Mongol Empire, which existed from 1206 to 1368. Their contributions in both domestic and political roles helped ensure the success of the empire. Women in the empire enjoyed more rights and independence compared to other societies of the same period. The women of the Mongol Empire consistently participated in setting up camp, herding livestock, political matters, property ownership, preparation of meals, military matters, making clothes, and more.

== Roles and responsibilities ==
Women often contributed and shared the daily responsibilities with their male counterparts. The roles of women included childbirth and child-raising, gathering and preparing food, taking care of the animals and livestock, making traditional Mongolian clothing, and setting up camps. As the Mongol Empire was formed from a lot of nomadic tribes forming together, they often moved seasonally. Women and men shared some responsibilities as a precaution in case one died, then the other would be able to continue on.

=== Labor ===
Mongol women were in charge of building and packing up the yurts, or ger, during travel. Within the yurts, men took the west side of the tents while the women took the east side of the tents, where most of the cooking was done. Men carved wood for yurts, while both men and women made the felt covering for the structure.

Women were responsible for the preparation of food and the maintenance of livestock and animals. While the men would hunt for food which can take a few weeks, the women would make other types of food using what they had. They milked cows and sheep, using the milk to produce cheeses, butter, and milk curds. Women churned milk for hours at a time to make kumis, a mildly alcoholic drink in which both men and women could drink as there wasn't "stigma attached to it and even having a certain honor".

A third important daily role of women were the making of traditional clothing. Women pounded sheep's wool into felt, which was used for clothing. Clothing was not only for warmth but used as gifts and forms of trade or dowry. The inner clothings were often made with silk or cotton while the other clothing contained additional fur or felt. The clothing was embroidered and designed by the women based on their respective social status with each design having a different meaning.

=== Marriage and family ===
Women in the Mongol Empire were expected to marry. Marriages were often used to strengthen clans and relationships or alliances. Some marriages were arranged with people of different clans to strengthen clan groups and alliances. Alternatively, sometimes women were abducted from an opposing clan and forced to marry in order to weaken the clan she came from. However, the most common form of marriage was between members of the same clan or within existing alliances to reinforce and stabilize clan groups and alliances. Marriage was important for both families. Richer men could marry multiple wives, as they could afford the bride price, the compensation given to the wife's family for the "loss" of their daughter. Some families performed "double marriage", in which two families each married a daughter to the other family's son, avoiding the exchange of a bride price.

After marriage, a woman was expected to have and raise children and to run the household. Both women and men would teach their children social expectations and the skills expected of their gender. Women often played an important role in the family's decision making. They attended to guests and entertained family, visitors, and allies. If a husband died, his wife would sometimes take over his position.

== Women's rights ==
In the Mongol Empire, women had a number of rights. Married women could divorce their husbands and own their own property. Both widowed and divorced women could remarry and inherit property. Women would sometimes remarry a male relative of the husband in order to keep the connection and the property within the family.

Women could participate in tribal meetings and represent their husband in them. A widow could represent her late husband in gatherings. A few Mongol women reigned as regents when her spouse died and the heir was not of age or hadn't been elected, which could take several years. Both men and women could be charged for adultery, which could be punished by execution.

In the Mongol Empire, both men and women could be shamans and practice shamanism. Mongol women could also donate money to support their religious groups.

== Notable women ==
Some of the female figures that contributed to the success of the Mongol Empire include:

- Börte Ujin (1161–1230): The first wife of Genghis Khan. She is considered one of the most important figures that helped her husband become a conqueror and foundation of the empire.
- Sorghaghtani Beki (1190–1252): The wife of Genghis Khan's youngest son, Tolui. She is considered one of the most capable people with her political influence and the raising of her sons to become heirs of the Empire.
- Töregene Khatun (d. 1246): The wife of Ögedei Khan until his death; she became regent for her son, Güyük Khan. She held a strong political influence and replaced her late husband's ministers with her own people and arrested a lot of officials.
- Khutulun (1260–1306): A Mongol noblewoman who was one of the most famous female warriors in the Empire. She was mentioned in Marco Polo's writings.
