= Qutuqa Beki =

Mongol leader

Chieftain of the Oirats
- Family: Dörbet Oirat
- Spouse: Botokhoi Targun

Qutuqa Beki (Note: Mongolian: Худуга бэхи/Хутуга бэх; ᠬᠤᠳᠤᠭ᠎ᠠ ᠪᠡᠬᠢ.) was a leader of the Oirats in the early 13th century. Although Qutuqa Beki resisted the rise of Genghis Khan in 1201 by submitting to Jamukha, he was forced to submit to Genghis in 1207. Qutuqa Beki was allowed to continue ruling over the Oirats and one of his sons was married to a daughter of Genghis.

== Biography ==
The first mentions of Qutuqa Beki in The Secret History of the Mongols date back to 1201, when a number of rulers of the Mongol tribes, including the Oirats, swore allegiance to Jamukha and chose him as a gurkhan, pledging to fight against Genghis Khan. According to a story, he along with the Naiman king Buyruq Khan, used a jada or "thunder stone" to unleash a powerful storm on Genghis' army. But the magical ploy backfired when an unexpected wind blew the storm back at Qutuqa. Buyruq, troubled by this storm, left the alliance and retreated to the south side of the Altai Mountains. Subsequently, Genghis Khan defeated Jamukha and the Naimans, but the Oirats had not yet been conquered by the time the Mongol Empire was formed in 1206. Nevertheless, when in 1207 Genghis Khan gave his eldest son Jochi the order to conquer the "forest peoples", Qutuqa was one of the first to obey, arriving with 10,000 Oirat soldiers. He then proceeded to the khan's court and submitted personally, having received such a powerful ally, Genghis married two women from his family to Qutuqa's children, thus starting one of the most fruitful alliances in Mongol history. He led an attack on Botokhoi Targun, chieftess of Khori-Tumed but was captured. Later he was given Botokhui as his concubine after Genghis Khan led an attack on them personally and subdued.

== Family ==
He had at least 3 children, all married into ruling Borjigin clan, however sources differ on which son married whom:

1. Toralchi Güregen — according to The Secret History of the Mongols was married Holuikhan (daughter of Jochi), but according to The Compendium of Chronicles he was given hand of Checheyigen (daughter of Genghis)
  1. Buqa Temür — commander of a tümen in Ilkhanate
    - Chupan — married to Nomoghan, daughter of Ariq Böke and Ashitai Khatun
    - Jagir (or Chakar) — married to Manggugan Khatun, daughter of Hulagu
      - Taraghai Güregen — married to Manggugan Khatun, daughter of Hulagu in levirate, then Ara Qutlugh, daughter of Möngke Temür
    - Tolun Khatun — married to Jumghur before 1270s, then Tekshin (until 12 September 1271), both sons of Hulagu
  2. Börtö'a — married to Princess Yixiji (Chinese: 一悉基), daughter of Genghis Khan
    - Uluq
    - Rachin
  3. Bars Buqa — married to El-Temür, daughter of Tolui and Linqgun Khatun (daughter of Kuchlug)
    - Shirab and Beglamish
      - Toq-Temür (unknown father) — married Emegen, daughter of Malik Temür, son of Ariq Böke
    - Emegen Khatun — married to Malik Temür, son of Ariq Böke
  4. Elchikmish Khatun — married to Ariq Böke, then his son Nairaqu Buqa
    - Ashiqtai (with Nairaqu)
  5. Orghana Khatun — married to Qara Hülegü
  6. Güyük Khatun — married Hulagu
  7. Öljei Khatun — married Hulagu, then Abaqa
  8. Küchü Khatun — married Toqoqan
    1. Mengu-Timur
    2. Tode Mongke
2. Inalchi — according to The Secret History of the Mongols was married Checheyigen (daughter of Genghis), but according to The Compendium of Chronicles he was given hand of Holuikhan (daughter of Jochi)
  1. Buduz
    - Negütai
    - Aqu Temür
3. Oghul Tutmish — initially planned to marry Tolui, but after his death was married to Möngke
  1. Shirin
  2. Bichige

== Sources ==
- Hope, Michael (2016). Power, Politics, and Tradition in the Mongol Empire and the Īlkhānate of Iran. Oxford University Press. doi:10.1093/acprof:oso/9780198768593.001.0001. ISBN 978-0-19-876859-3.
