= Botohui-Tarhun =

13th Century Siberian Queen

Botohui-Tarhun (13th Century CE), also spelled Botoqui Tarqun (Chinese: 孛脫灰·塔兒渾), was the queen of a 13th century Siberian tribe. mentioned in the Secret History of the Mongols. The name "Botohui-Tarhun" roughly translates to "Big and Fierce"

== Encounter with Genghis Khan ==
The Khori-Tumed was formed by a part of the Tumed tribe uniting with the Khori tribe. Botoqui Tarqun, the queen and ruler of the Khori-Tumed, was the wife of the deceased Khori-Tumed chieftain Darduqul-Soqor. During the Mongol conquest of Western Xia and the Jin dynasty (1207 - 1215 CE), while Genghis Khan's army was on campaign, many previously conquered Siberian tribes under the leadership of Botohui-Tarhun stopped sending the Mongols tributes of furs and women. The Mongols send an envoy to investigate why the tributes had stopped and to demand 30 maidens from the tribes as wives. Rather than submit to the request, Botohui-Tarhun took the envoy as captive. When the envoy did not return, Genghis Khan dispatched a negotiator. Botohui-Tarhun took this negotiator as captive as well.

In 1219 (Year of the Hare), Genghis Khan sent a general with a detachment to investigate. Botohui-Tarhun's forces ambushed the detachment in the forest and killed the general. Enraged, Genghis Khan sent a larger army to subdue the tribes. The Mongol forces set a decoy on the frontier trail, while cutting a new trail through the forest to flank the Siberian tribe. In a surprise attack from the new trail, the Mongols directly attacked Botohui-Tarhun's headquarters. According to The Secret History, the Mongol attack was so fast that it appeared they had entered "through the top of the smoke-holes of [the Siberian tribes'] tents"

Upon victory, the Mongols imprisoned the members of the tribe. Botohui-Tarhun was married off to the second of the envoys, Qutuqa Beki, which she might have already married during his captivity.
