= Thomas T. Allsen =

American historian (1940–2019)

Thomas Theodore Allsen (February 16, 1940 – February 18, 2019) was an American historian specializing in Mongolian studies.

Following the completion of a Bachelor of Arts degree in history from Portland State University in 1962, Allsen attended the University of Washington to pursue a Master of Arts in Russian studies. In 1969, he graduated from the University of Oregon with a Master of Library Science degree. He completed a doctoral degree at the University of Minnesota in 1979 and began teaching at Western Kentucky University. The next year, Allsen joined the faculty of the Trenton State College History Department.

He received a Guggenheim Fellowship in 2002, and retired from The College of New Jersey in the same year. Between 1986 and 2013, Allsen served on the editorial staff of the journal Archivum Eurasiae Medii Aevi. The journal published a Festschrift for Thomas T. Allsen in Celebration of His 75th Birthday in its 21st volume (2014–15).

Allsen died on February 18, 2019, aged 79.

== Selected Bibliography ==
- "The Mongols and Siberia." in The Cambridge History of the Mongol Empire, ed. Michal Biran and Kim Hodong, Vol. 1. Cambridge: Cambridge University Press, 2022.
- The Steppe and the Sea: Pearls in the Mongol Empire. University of Pennsylvania Press, 2019.
- "Population Movements in Mongol Eurasia". Nomads as Agents of Cultural Change: The Mongols and Their Eurasian Predecessors, edited by Reuven Amitai, Michal Biran and Anand A. Yang, Honolulu: University of Hawaii Press, 2015, pp. 119–151. https://doi.org/10.1515/9780824847890-009
- The royal hunt in Eurasian history. University of Pennsylvania Press, 2006.
- "Technologies of Government in the Mongolian Empire: A Geographical Overview." In Imperial Statecraft: Political Forms and Techniques of Governance in Inner Asia, Sixth–Twentieth Centuries, edited by David Sneath, 117–40. Bellingham: Center for East Asian Studies, Western Washington University, 2006.
- Culture and Conquest in Mongol Eurasia. Cambridge University Press, 2004.
- "The Circulation of Military Technology in the Mongolian Empire". In Warfare in Inner Asian History (500–1800), (Leiden, The Netherlands: Brill, 2002) doi: https://doi.org/10.1163/9789004391789_008
- "Sharing out the Empire: Apportioned Lands Under the Mongols." In Nomads in the Sedentary World, edited by Anatoly Khazanov and André Wink, 172–90. Richmond, Surrey: Curzon, 2001.
- Commodity and Exchange in the Mongol Empire A Cultural History of Islamic Textiles. Cambridge University Press, 1997.
- "The Rise of the Mongolian Empire and Mongolian Rule in North China." In The Cambridge History of China, Volume 6: Alien Regimes and Border States, 907–1368, edited by Herbert Franke and Denis Twitchett, 321–413. New York and Cambridge: Cambridge University Press, 1994.
- "Mongolian Princes and Their Merchant Partners, 1200–1260." Asia Major, third series, 2(2): 83–126 (1989).
- Mongol imperialism: the policies of the Grand Qan Mongke in China, Russia, and the Islamic lands, 1251–9. xvii, 278 pp. Berkeley and Los Angeles: University of California Press, 1987.
- "Mongols and North Caucasia." Archivum Eurasiae medii aevi 7: 5–40. 91 (1987).
- "The Princes of the Left Hand: An Introduction to the History of the Ulus 87 of Orda in the Thirteenth and Fourteenth Centuries." Archivum Eurasiae medii aevi 5: 5–40 (1985).
- "The Yuan Dynasty and the Uighurs of Turfan in the 13th Century". China Among Equals: The Middle Kingdom and its Neighbors, 10th–14th Centuries, edited by Morris Rossabi, Berkeley: University of California Press, 1983, pp. 243–280. https://doi.org/10.1525/9780520341722-014
- "Prelude to the Western Campaigns: Mongol Military Operations in the Volga-Ural Region, 1217–1237." Archivum Eurasiae medii aevi 3: 5–24 (1983).
