= Chagatai Khan =

Second son of Genghis Khan and Börte (c. 1184 – 1242)

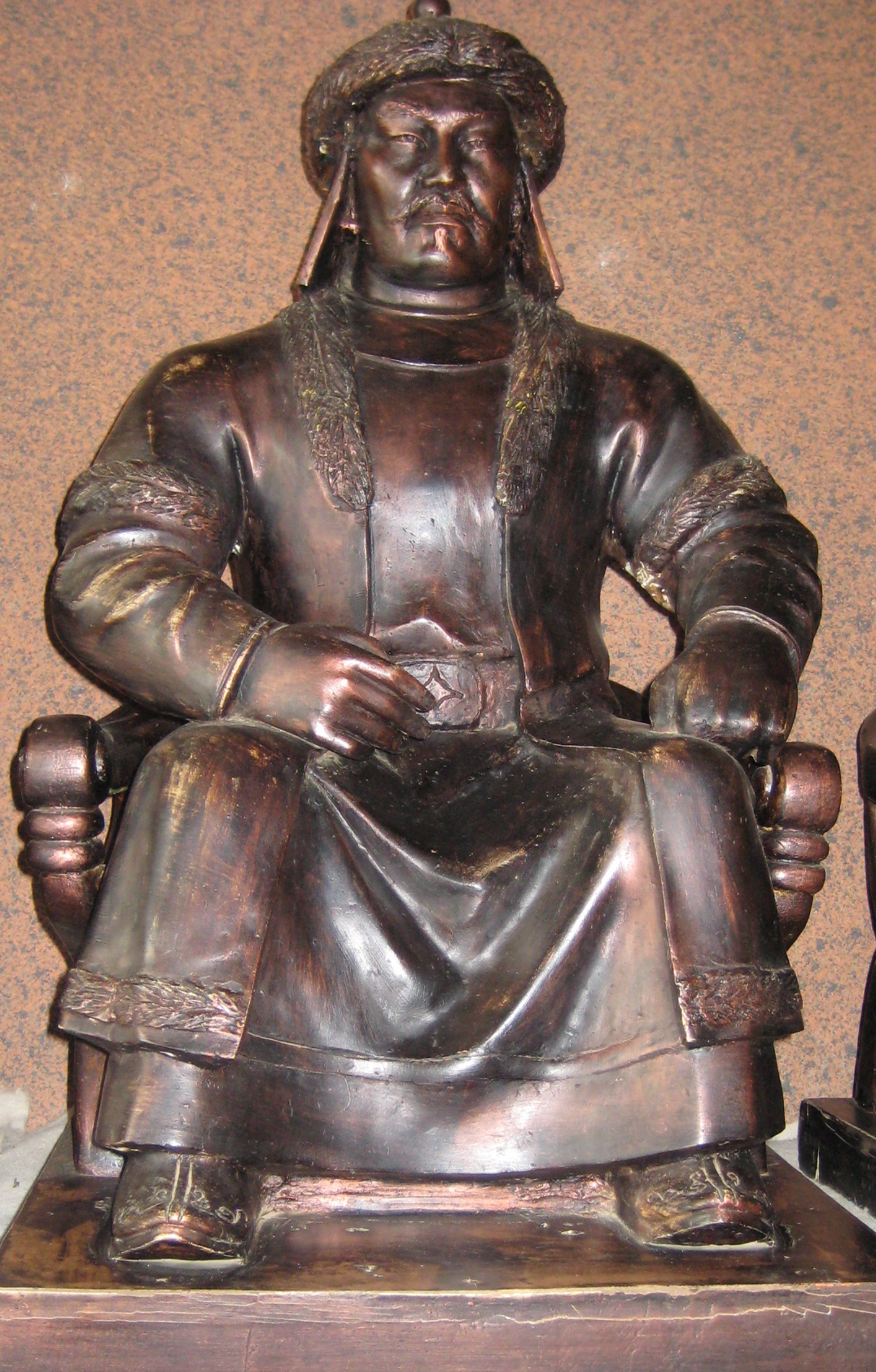
- Statue of Chagatai Khan in Mongolia

Khan of the Chagatai Khanate
- Reign: 1227–1242
- Successor: Qara Hülëgü
- Born: c. 1184
- Died: 1242 (aged 57–58)
- Consort: Yesülün; Tögen; others
- Issue: Mutukan; Baidar; Yesü Möngke; others
- House: Borjigin
- Father: Genghis Khan
- Mother: Börte
- Military career
- Conflicts: Mongol conquest of the Jin dynasty; Mongol invasion of the Khwarazmian Empire; Otrar Catastrophe; Siege of Gurganj; Battle of the Indus; Mongol conquest of Western Xia

Chagatai Khan (Mongolian: ᠴᠠᠭᠠᠲᠠᠶ; (Note: Also transliterated as Cha'adai, Chaghatai, Chagaday, Chagatay, Ca'adai, Chaghadai, Chagatay, or Tsagaadai.) c. 1184 – 1242) was a son of Genghis Khan, a prominent figure in the early Mongol Empire, and the first khan of the Chagatai Khanate. The second son of Genghis's wife Börte, Chagatai was renowned for his masterful knowledge of Mongol custom and law, which he scrupulously obeyed, as well as his harsh temperament. Because Genghis felt that he was too inflexible in character, most notably never accepting the legitimacy of his elder brother Jochi, he excluded Chagatai from succession to the Mongol throne. He was nevertheless a key figure in ensuring the stability of the empire after Genghis's death and during the reign of his younger brother Ögedei Khan.

Chagatai held military commands alongside his brothers during the Mongol conquest of the Jin dynasty in 1211 and the invasion of the Khwarazmian Empire in 1219. During the latter, he was appointed to a key role in organising logistics in addition to battlefield responsibilities, but was censured after feuding with Jochi during the Siege of Gurganj. After the campaign, Chagatai was granted large tracts of conquered land in Central Asia, which he ruled until his death. He quarrelled with civil officials such as Mahmud Yalavach over matters of jurisdiction and advised Ögedei on questions of rulership. Chagatai died shortly after Ögedei in 1242; his descendants ruled his territories as the eponymous Chagatai Khanate.

== Early life and personality ==
Chagatai's mother, Börte, was born into the Onggirat tribe, who lived along the Greater Khingan mountain range south of the Ergüne river, in modern-day Inner Mongolia. She married a Mongol leader (Note: At this point in time, the word "Mongols" only referred to the members of one tribe in northeast Mongolia; because this tribe played a central role in the formation of the Mongol Empire, their name was later used for all the tribes.) named Temüjin c. 1178 after a seven-year betrothal. After giving birth to a daughter named Qojin, Börte was kidnapped and raped by members of the Merkit tribe—the true paternity of her next child, a son named Jochi, was never known, although Temüjin accepted his legitimacy. Chagatai, born in late 1183 or 1184, was thus the first son definitively fathered by Temüjin. He had six younger full siblings: two brothers named Ögedei and Tolui, and four sisters named Checheyigen, Alaqa, Tümelün, and Al Altan.

In 1206, having united the tribes of Mongolia, Temüjin held a large assembly called a kurultai where he was acclaimed as "Genghis Khan". He began to reorder his new nation, dividing it between members of his ruling dynasty. Chagatai was granted territories near the Altai Mountains, where the Naiman tribe had previously ruled. He also received either 4,000 or 8,000 subjects, drawn from the Jalayir, Barlas, Suldus, Sonit, and Dughlat tribes. Chagatai's two primary wives were the Onggirat women Yesülün and Tögen, the daughters of Börte's cousin Qata; Yesülün was his favourite and the mother of his favourite son Mutukan. His other named sons were Mochi Yaba, the son of one of Yesülün's servants and thus given little regard by his father, as well as Balgashi, Sarban, Yesu-Mongke, and Baidar, whose mothers are unknown.

Chagatai was renowned for his expertise in Mongol laws and traditional customs, especially when it came to following the will of the khan. According to some sources, Genghis entrusted him and his adopted brother Shigi Qutuqu with administering the legal code known as the Yasa. Medieval chroniclers such as Juzjani noted his strictness in interpreting the law and the harshness of his temperament.

== Military campaigns ==
Alongside his brothers Jochi and Ögedei, Chagatai commanded the right wing in the 1211 invasion of the Chinese Jin dynasty. The Mongols marched southwards from Genghis's campaign headquarters in modern Inner Mongolia in November 1211: first they attacked the cities in the area between Hohhot and Datong, and then they followed the Taihang Mountains into Shanxi, where they pillaged and plundered in autumn 1213, capturing the pastures of their enemies' cavalry reserves. During the 1219 invasion of the Khwarazmian Empire, Chagatai was charged with building bridges and maintaining roads to speed the Mongol advance and keep lines of communication open, in which capacity he was aided by his retainer Zhang Rong (1158–1230).

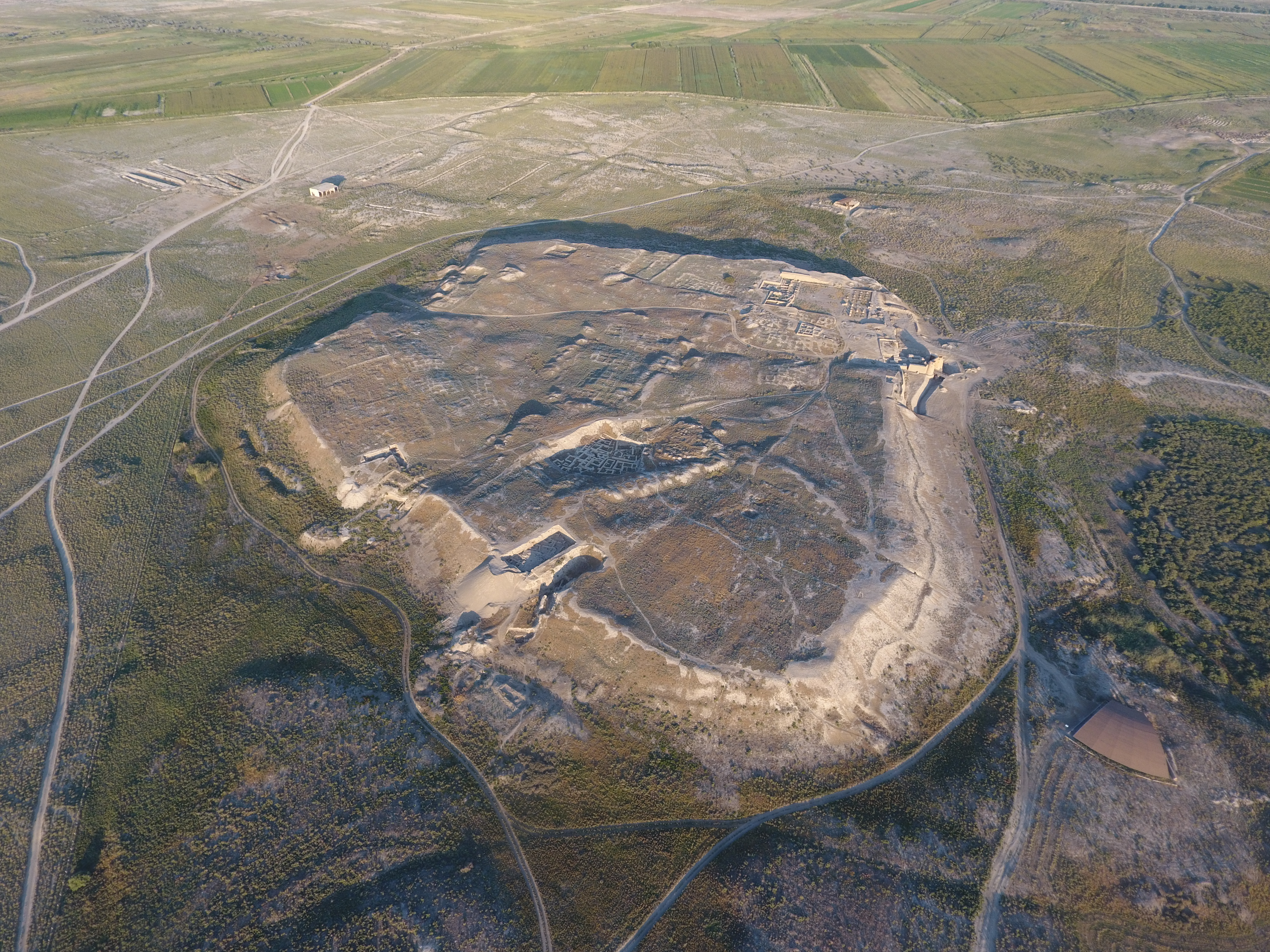
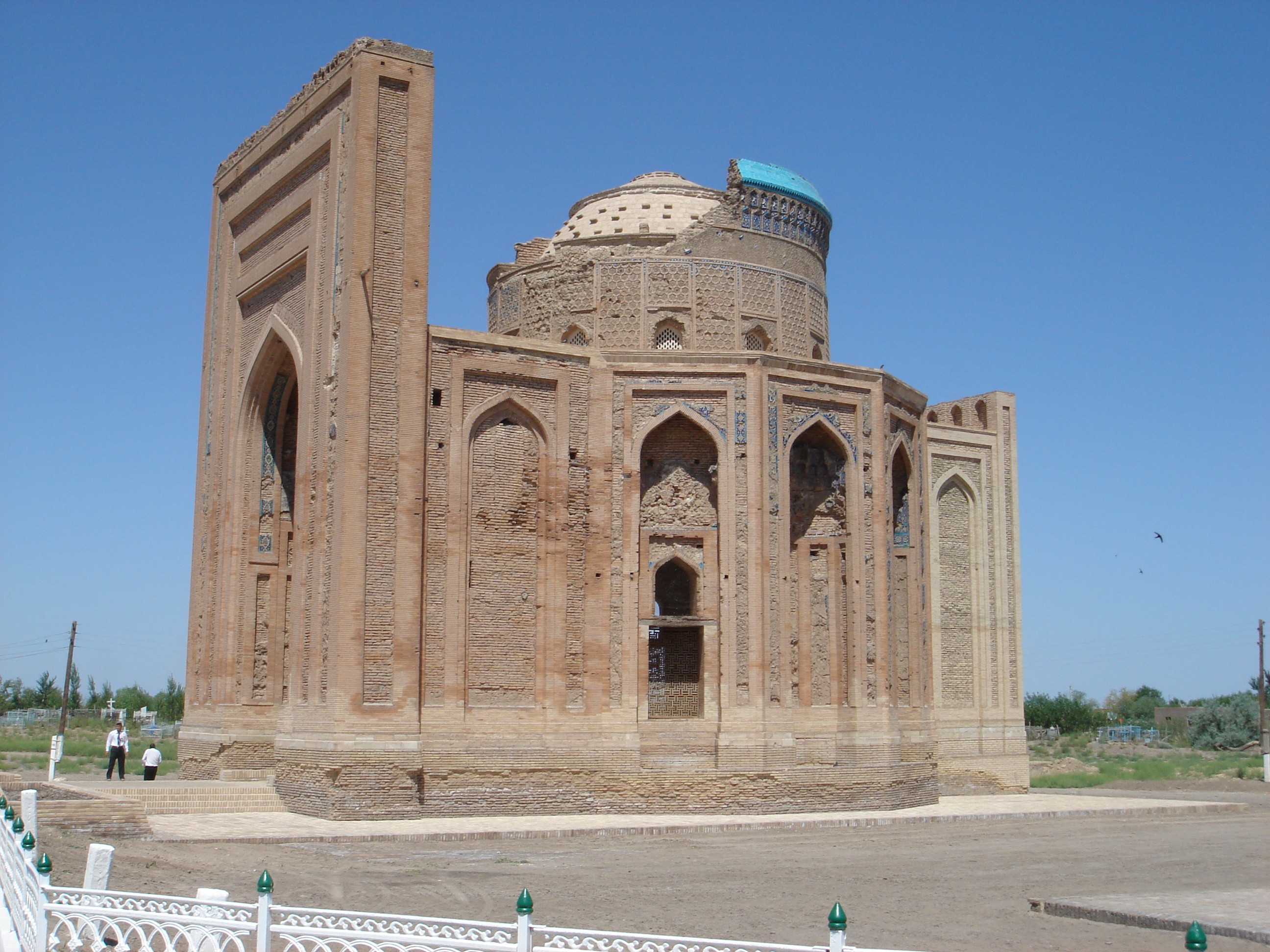
Ruins of Otrar (top) and Gurganj (bottom), two cities captured by Chagatai

He and Ögedei took charge of the siege of the city of Otrar, whose governor Inalchuq had provoked the invasion, while their father and brothers moved on. Its inhabitants fought fiercely for five months but were weakened by the defection of a leading general, who was executed by Ögedei and Chagatai because of his disloyalty. The city eventually fell in February 1220; Inalchuq held out for another month in the citadel before being captured himself. In revenge for Inalchuq's actions, the Mongols either killed or enslaved Otrar's entire population, while pillaging and destroying their town. Chagatai and Ögedei brought Inalchuq to their father at the siege of Samarkand, where he was publicly executed.

Chagatai and Ögedei were then sent to join Jochi at the Siege of Gurganj, the capital of the Khwarazmian Empire. The siege was lengthy, lasting between four and seven months, and exceptionally fierce: the defiant Khwarazmian defenders forced the Mongol army to engage in bitter house-by-house urban warfare, with much of the city destroyed either by burning naphtha or flooding from collapsed dams. After the city's eventual fall in April 1221, its inhabitants were either killed or enslaved. The usual narrative of the siege recounts that Jochi and Chagatai quarrelled on how best to conduct its progress, as Jochi presumed that the rich city would become part of his domain and wished to damage it as little as possible. Chagatai on the other hand held no such qualms. When Genghis heard about this infighting, he ordered that Ögedei be promoted to command his brothers. The historian Christopher Atwood however argues that the narrative of fraternal conflicts was a later invention designed to buttress Ögedei's right to rule the empire and that Jochi in reality retained primacy throughout the siege.

Chagatai returned to his father's side during the siege of Taliqan, which fell in summer 1221. Unknown to him, his favourite son Mutukan had died while besieging Bamiyan, whose population was massacred by the Mongols at the request of Mutukan's widow. Genghis had been angered by Chagatai's failure to capture Gurganj without significant Mongol casualties, and he decided to teach his son a lesson in self-control. He summoned Chagatai to his tent and accused him of not following orders; Chagatai replied that he would rather be executed than disobey. Genghis then revealed Mutukan's death and ordered Chagatai not to grieve—the latter managed to control himself until he was able to weep in private. He was later present at the defeat of the Khwarazmian prince Jalal al-Din at the Battle of the Indus in November 1221, and commanded the rearguard during his father's final campaign against the Western Xia state.

== Succession question ==
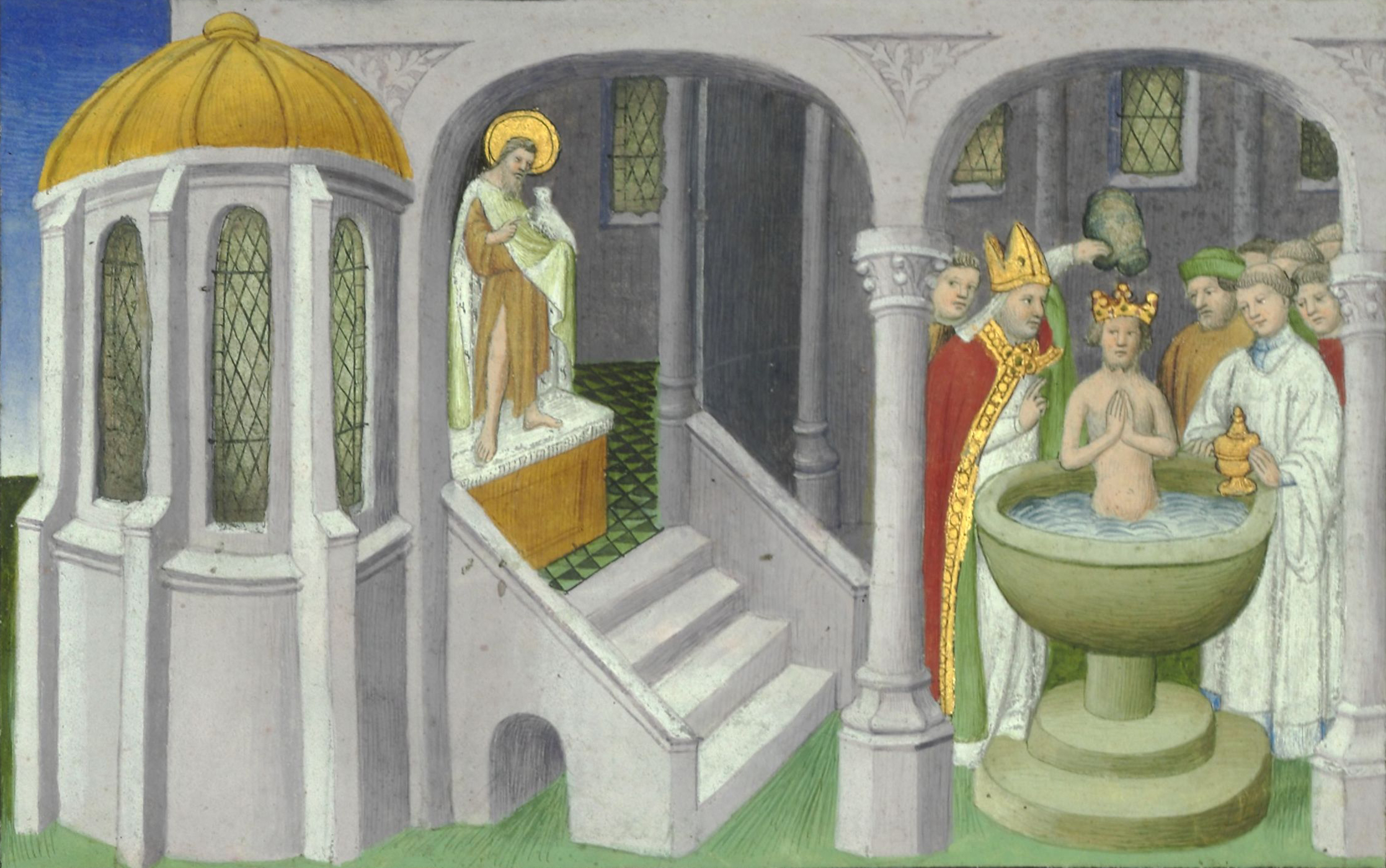
Early 15th-century miniature from Marco Polo's section of the Livre des merveilles manuscript. It depicts Chagatai being baptised into Christianity; there is however no evidence he was ever a Christian.

The tribes of the Mongol steppe had no fixed succession system, and instead tended to elect a successor at a kurultai after the death of a ruler; importantly, the kurultai was not obliged to follow the wishes of the previous ruler. Although some Mongols argued that Chagatai's traits would make him an excellent successor to his father, Genghis thought that he was too strict and narrow-minded, indicating a degree of inflexibility that did not suit a ruler. Genghis was also concerned about Chagatai's intense dislike for Jochi, whom Chagatai regarded as illegitimate: at one family meeting, he reportedly called his brother a "Merkit bastard" and started brawling with him in front of their father. For these reasons, Genghis excluded Chagatai from succession to the throne. Jochi was also eliminated because of his rumoured illegitimacy, although Genghis himself did not care. Their younger brother Ögedei was eventually designated as heir.

After the death of Genghis Khan in 1227, Chagatai played a role in stabilising the empire before Ögedei's accession in 1229. Tolui, who assumed the regency and who had also been a candidate for succession, considered attempting to gain power himself. Chagatai, who after Jochi's death c. 1225 held the authority of Genghis's eldest son, and many others remained unwaveringly faithful to Genghis's will, and prevented any usurpation of power. Chagatai presided over the coronation ceremony alongside Tolui and their uncle Temüge and was a stalwart follower of Ögedei throughout his reign. In return, Ögedei often sought his elder brother's advice and sent his eldest son Güyük to serve as one of Chagatai's guards. Chagatai nevertheless chastised Ögedei for his excessive drinking and made him agree to limit the number of cups of alcohol he drank; Ögedei managed to get around this restriction by finding a very large cup.

== Ruler in Central Asia ==
Map of the Chagatai Khanate in the late 1200s, extending from the cities of Bukhara and Samarkand in Transoxiana to the region of Almaliq in Xinjiang

After the conclusion of the Khwarazmian campaign, Chagatai had been allocated a wide span of territories in Central Asia, stretching from the former Uighur territories near Almaliq, which became his capital and summer pastures, to the Amu Darya river in Transoxiana, which served as his winter pastures. These territories, roughly encompassing modern Uzbekistan, Tajikistan, Kyrgyzstan, southern Kazakhstan, and parts of Xinjiang in China, had been ruled by the Qara Khitai state during the late 1100s, and contained a mixture of nomadic and sedentary populations. Chagatai and his descendants remained largely nomadic in the Mongol tradition and often disagreed with the governors of the settlements in Transoxiana, who were representatives not of the Chagatayids but of the ruler of the empire.

Tension soon developed between one such official named Mahmud Yalavach and Chagatai. In 1238, the population of Bukhara, led by a sieve-maker, revolted against tax demands—the rebellion attracted wide support and succeeded in expelling the Mongol garrison. Chagatai did not help and left the revolt to Ögedei, whose armies quickly suppressed the uprising; the population faced total slaughter but was spared after Mahmud argued that only a part had been involved. It is likely that Chagatai exploited the situation to Mahmud's detriment, although the precise details are unknown.

Soon afterwards, Chagatai transferred the control of certain lands under Mahmud's jurisdiction to one of his own followers. Mahmud complained to Ögedei, who ordered his brother to explain himself. Upon receiving an apology, Ögedei settled the tense situation to the satisfaction of all by sanctioning Chagatai's initial transfer, moving Mahmud to an important post in north China, and promoting Mahmud's son to govern in his place with the same powers as his father. Chagatai also squabbled with Körgüz, his brother's governor in the region of Khorasan.

== Death and legacy ==
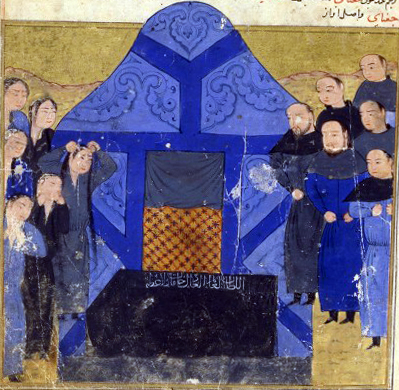
Depiction of the funeral of Chagatai Khan, from a 15th-century manuscript of the Jami' al-tawarikh

After Ögedei's death from alcoholism in December 1241, Chagatai was the de facto kingmaker. Ögedei's favourite wife Möge initially assumed control but Töregene, the mother of his presumptive heir Güyük, sought to become regent; she crucially persuaded Chagatai that she was suitable, and with his support attained the position. Chagatai died in 1242; he was replaced as the senior Genghisid prince by Jochi's son Batu. Yesülün accused one of Chagatai's stewards, an Uighur from North China named Vajir, of poisoning him, and had him executed. Chagatai was succeeded in Central Asia by Qara Hülegü, the son of Mutukan, but he was usurped by his drunkard uncle Yesü-Möngke between 1246 and 1250, causing long-term weaknesses in the territories which became known as the Chagatai Khanate.

Although Chagatai's loyalty to nomadic customs meant that he constructed no more than pools for waterfowl, storehouses, and small villages in his territories, he was a capable ruler who recruited both foreign educated experts and local Uighur officials to help administer his realm. Because Chagatai was a strict upholder of the traditional Mongol law, which forbade various elements of Islamic Sharia law, such as animal slaughter, ritual hygiene, or public prayer, he gained a reputation for being anti-Muslim. One contemporary Muslim writer claimed that he urged Ögedei to kill every Muslim in the empire. Modern historians such as Michael Hope and Peter Jackson suggest this is likely far from the truth: they point to a number of powerful Muslim officials and nobles at Chagatai's court on whom he relied and whom he would have been unlikely to unnecessarily antagonise. More probable is the theory he forbade the practice of any non-Mongol legal system at his court. Nevertheless, his anti-Islamic and pro-Yasa reputation strongly influenced his descendants, who were far slower to convert to Islam than their counterparts in the other Mongol khanates, the Golden Horde and the Ilkhanate.

Preceded by None	Khan of Chagatai Khanate; 1225–1242	Succeeded by Qara Hülëgü
