= Sulduz (tribe) =

Mongolian tribe

Sulduz or Suldus is a Mongolian tribe that entered the empire of Genghis Khan at the beginning of the 13th century.

Sulduz was part of the Darlekin-Mongol community. There is a version that the name of the tribe was given by the wild plant of the same name, which is believed to grow densely in areas where Sulduz people used to move along. From the end of the 12th century, part of the Suldus people, together with the Besudi and Baarin, became a part of the Taichiuds and were subordinated to them. After the defeat of the Taichiuds, one of the large groups of sulduz among the troops of Genghis Khan settled in Cumania and partly in the territory of modern Uzbekistan, as well as in the north of Afghanistan. They later moved to Azerbaijan and Iran. Some of the most influential emirs under Genghis Khan's command were suldus people, as they greatly helped in the war with the Taichiuds.

Sorgan-Shira, one of the nine servants of Genghis Khan, came from a sulduz family. Sorgan-Shiren's sons, Chilaun and Chimbay, were commanders of the personal guard of Genghis Khan. Chilaun's children founded the Chobanid dynasty, which held high positions in the Hulagu nation, and later established their own state in the territory of Iranian Azerbaijan. The descendants of Chobanids within the Hazaras are known as Dai Chopan. Khadaan, daughter of Sorgan-Shiren, was one of Genghis Khan's concubines.

== See also ==
- Chobanids
