= Chinggisids =

Descendants of Genghis Khan

Portrait of Genghis Khan.

The Chinggisids were the descendants of Genghis Khan, also known as Chinggis Khan, and his first wife Börte. The dynasty, which evolved from Genghis Khan's own Borjigin tribe, ruled the Mongol Empire and its successor states. The "Chinggisid principle"—that only descendants of Genghis Khan and Börte could be legitimate rulers of the Mongol or post-Mongol world—would be an important concept for centuries, until the fall of Kazakh Khanate, the last states ruled by Chinggisid monarchs, in 1847.

The Borjigin lineage, descendants of Kaidu, an early Mongol leader, were initially one of many clans inhabiting the Mongol heartland. Genghis Khan was born c. 1162, son of a Borjigit warrior named Yesügei, a member of the Qiyat sub-clan; over the next decades, he subjugated or killed all potential rivals, Borjigit or not. By the time that Genghis established the Mongol Empire in 1206, the only remaining Borjigit were the descendants of Yesügei. They formed the altan uruq (lit. 'Golden Family')—the only people allowed to rule in the empire. Of these, the descendants of Genghis and his first, primary wife Börte held the highest seniority; the Chinggisid Principle was that this particular lineage—the eponymous Chinggisids—were the only legitimate rulers. Mongol religious ideology held that the Chinggisids would eventually become rulers of the entire world.

Because of the Mongol conquests, the Chinggisids became the rulers of most of Eurasia, even after the Mongol Empire split into successor states: the Golden Horde, the Chagatai Khanate, the Ilkhanate, and the Yuan dynasty.

== Genetics ==
According to a study analysing Y-chromosome Haplogroups of Mongolic speaking populations, geneticists Sabitov and Batbayar used highly detailed, verified historical pedigrees (such as the Altan Tobchi and Erdeniin Tobchi) to identify modern Mongolian men who possessed undisputed paperwork proving their direct, unbroken patrilineal descent from Dayan Khan (1474-1517) who was the Great Khagan of Northern Yuan, and direct descendant of Genghis Khan. The researchers tested 7 different male line families who were descendants of completely different branches of Dayan Khan's sons. And when the Y-chromosomes were sequenced, all seven matched, sharing the exact same downstream mutations, and determined Dayan Khan had the C2c1a1a1-M407 Y-Haplogroup, and is the most plausible candidate for the Y-chromosome lineage of Genghis Khan.

According to a study using molecular genealogy, Y-chromosome haplotypes from the Lu clan in northwestern China, who claim to be descendants of Genghis Khan’s sixth son, Toghan, mostly belong to the Y-chromosome haplogroup C2b1a1b1-F1756. This haplogroup is widely distributed among Altaic-speaking populations and is closely related to the Tore clan from Kazakhstan, who claim descent from Genghis Khan’s first son, Jochi. The most recent common ancestor of the haplotype cluster, which includes the Lu and Tore clans, lived about 1000 years ago. Members of the Huo and Tuo clans, who, according to oral tradition, were close male relatives of the Lu clan, do not share common Y-chromosome lines with the Lu clan. Therefore, the haplogroup C2b1a1b1-F1756 may be another candidate for the true Y-chromosome lineage of Genghis Khan.

According to an international group of geneticists studying Y-chromosome data, in 2003, almost 8% of men living within the former Mongolian Empire (0.5% of the world's population) had almost identical Y chromosomes. Accordingly, in 2003 there were about 16 million descendants of Genghis Khan.

== Sources ==
- Atwood, Christopher P. (2004). Encyclopedia of Mongolia and the Mongol Empire. New York: Facts on File. ISBN 978-0-8160-4671-3.
- Dunnell, Ruth W. (2023). "The Rise of Chinggis Khan and the United Empire". In Biran, Michal; Kim, Hodong (eds.). The Cambridge History of the Mongol Empire. Cambridge: Cambridge University Press. pp. 19–106. ISBN 978-1-3163-3742-4.
- Hope, Michael; May, Timothy (2022). "Introduction". In May, Timothy; Hope, Michael (eds.). The Mongol World. Abingdon: Routledge. pp. 1–15. ISBN 978-1-3151-6517-2.
- May, Timothy (2017). "The Altan Urugh and the Chinggisid Principle". In May, Timothy (ed.). The Mongol Empire: A Historical Encyclopedia. Vol. II. Santa Barbara: ABC-CLIO. p. 15. ISBN 978-1-6106-9339-4.
- Togan, Isenbike (2022). "The Early Mongol State". In May, Timothy; Hope, Michael (eds.). The Mongol World. Abingdon: Routledge. pp. 68–86. ISBN 978-1-3151-6517-2.
