= Börte =

First wife of Genghis Khan (c. 1161–1230)

Börte Бөртэ

Khatun of the Mongol Empire
- Tenure: 1206 – August 1227
- Successor: Boraqchin
- Born: 1161
- Died: 1230 (aged 68–69)
- Burial: Burkhan Khaldun, Khentii Province, Mongolia
- Spouse: Genghis Khan
- Issue: Jochi; Chagatai; Ögedei; Tolui; Qojin; Alakhai Bekhi; Tümelün; Altalun; Checheikhen
Posthumous name
- Empress Guangxian Yisheng (光獻翼聖皇后)
- House: Onggirat
- Father: Dei Sechen
- Mother: Chotan
- Religion: Tengrism

Börte Üjin (/ˈbɜːrti ˈuːdʒɪn/; Mongolian: ᠪᠥᠷᠲᠡ ᠦᠵᠢᠨ Бөртэ үжин), better known as Börte (c. 1161–1230), was the first wife of Temüjin, who became Genghis Khan, the founder of the Mongol Empire. Börte became the head of the first Court of Genghis Khan, and Grand Empress of his Empire. She was betrothed to Genghis at a young age, married at seventeen, and then kidnapped by a rival tribe. Her husband's rescue of her is considered one of the key events that started him on his path to becoming a conqueror. She gave birth to four sons and five daughters, who, along with their own descendants, were the primary bloodline in the expansion of the Mongol Empire.

== Early life ==
Few historical facts are known about her early life, though she is a subject of a number of Mongolian legends. What little is known is generally from The Secret History of the Mongols, the oldest surviving literary work in the Mongolian language, written for the Mongol royal family some time after the death of Genghis Khan in 1227.

Börte was born c. 1161 into the Olkhonud of Khongirad. This tribe was friendly to the Borjigin tribe, into which Temüjin was born. She was the daughter of Dei-Sechen and Chotan. She was described as having a "fair complexion", with "light in her face and fire in her eyes", a term signifying intelligence. The girls that came from the Olkhonud tribe were known for being particularly beautiful.

== Marriage ==
Börte was the first wife of Temüjin. When Temüjin was 9 years old, his father Yesügei went in search of a wife for him. He set out to find a girl from Temüjin's mother's people, the Olqunu'ut, but along the way ran into Börte's father, Dei-Sechen. Dei-Sechen explained he had a dream the previous night about Yesügei arriving with his son and believed this was a good omen. He explained that the women of his people, the Onggirat, were known for having beautiful girls; and stated that his daughter Börte, who was then 10, would make a good wife for Temüjin. Upon meeting Börte, Yesügei described her as a girl "who had light in her face, who had fire in her eyes", and after spending the night asked Dei-Sechen for Börte's hand in marriage for his son. Dei-Sechen agreed, under the condition that Temüjin stay with Börte's family as his bride price.

On his return from this trip, Yesügei encountered some Tatars having a feast and decided to join them, whereupon they poisoned his food. He completed his journey back home before collapsing and ultimately dying. Before he died, Yesügei insisted Temüjin be called back home to take care of his siblings in the absence of their father. Dei-Sechen agreed to allow Temüjin to return to his family, and so Börte and Temüjin were separated quickly after their betrothal.

In 1178, after 7 years apart, Temüjin set out to be reunited with Börte. After finding her in the same village in which she lived before, he married her, and the two left for a new home on the Senggür Stream, located in the Gürelgü Mountains. Soon after, they moved to set up a new homestead on the Burgi Escarpment near the Keuren River. Here, Börte's dowry, a black sable coat, was gifted to Yesügei's old friend Ong Qan, reestablishing a friendship between the two families.

== Abduction ==
Soon after her marriage to Temüjin was made official, the Burgi Escarpment was attacked by the Three Merkit, who were a confederation of three tribes inhabiting the basin of the Selenga and Orkhon Rivers. Temüjin and his family were able to escape on horses, but there were no horses left for Börte. A servant at the camp tried to hide Börte in an old cart, which he harnessed to an ox to try to escape upstream with her. The cart eventually broke and when the servant tried to keep moving Börte on foot, they were surrounded by soldiers who discovered her within the cart. The Three Merkit believed their raid victorious as they had planned it in retaliation for the abduction of Hö'elün, Temüjin's mother, from their people many years before.

Temüjin was distressed by the abduction of his wife and remarked that his bed "was made empty" and his breast was "torn apart". Ong Qan, who had been gifted Börte's dowry, promised to help Temüjin recover Börte from the Three Merkit, and together they came up with a plan to return her. Eight months later the pair led a charge into the Barqujin territory, and upon their arrival the Merkit people fled in numbers down the Selengge River. Börte and Temüjin were finally reunited, as described in The Secret History of the Mongols:

As the pillaging and plundering went on, Temüjin moved among the people that were hurriedly escaping, calling, 'Börte, Börte!' And so he came upon her, for Lady Börte was among those fleeing people. She heard the voice of Temüjin and, recognizing it, she got off the cart and came running towards him. Although it was still night, Lady Börte and Qo'aqčin both recognized Temüjin's reins and tether and grabbed them. It was moonlight; he looked at them, recognized Lady Börte, and they fell into each other's arms.

Later, as Khan, Temüjin exterminated the Merkit people and enslaved their women.

== Rule ==
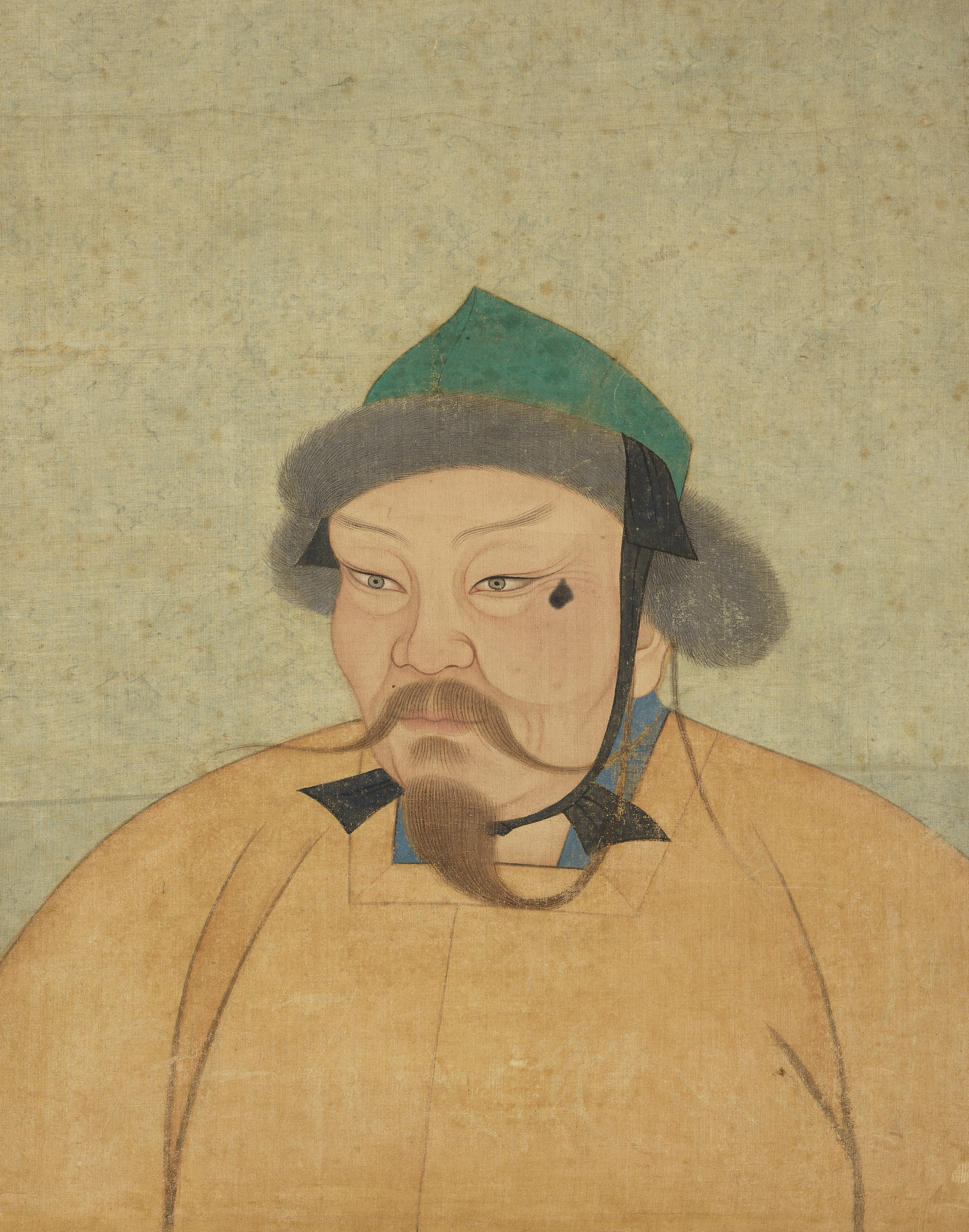
Börte's husband Genghis Khan (top) and third son Ögedei (bottom)

Börte brought with her independent wealth, based on her dowry, and a shrewd and intelligent mind. She shared some responsibilities with her mother-in-law Hö'elün, including the management of human and animal resources and the economy of the camp overall.

Around 1179, the first of Börte's children, Qojin, was born. Börte's nine children were integral to Temüjin's rule; her five daughters would go on to marry key political allies to cement diplomatic relationships, while her four sons aided in Temüjin's conquests throughout Asia.

Additionally, Börte managed pan-Asian trade routes, and acted as advisor to officials and merchants traveling these roads. She maintained considerable power in this position as detailed by multiple documented events. In one particular instance, she had successfully advised Temüjin to cut ties with Jamuqa, a military leader, once she had deemed that the alliance was no longer mutually beneficial. Additionally, she insisted that a shaman, Teb Tenggeri, be challenged for insulting his youngest brother, Temuge Otchigin. Both of these requests were dutifully followed by Temüjin.

She was revered by the Mongols after Temüjin became Genghis Khan, and she was crowned the Grand Empress.

Börte, on several occasions, influenced her husband's decisions, as Genghis both respected and appreciated Börte's insight on political relationships. One such incident was when Otchigin came into Genghis Khan's tent while he was still in bed with Börte, and asked for help against the Qongqotan tribe. Before Genghis Khan could say anything, Börte "sat up in bed, covering her breasts with the edge of the blanket" and described the cruelty of the Qongqotan. After listening to his wife speak, Genghis Khan decided to help Otchigin. There is also evidence of Börte influencing how strict Genghis was with members of his cabinet.

As Genghis Khan continued to expand his influence and empire, Börte remained behind and assisted Genghis' brother Temüge in ruling the Mongol homeland. Other wives accompanied Genghis Khan on his campaigns, while she ruled her own territory and managed her own court. Most of the Kherlen River was assigned to her, land that had before belonged to the Tatars. Only her sons were considered to be candidates to succeed Temüjin as Khans. Meanwhile, she also adopted multiple orphans, including Qutqu Noyan and Buda Noyan, and raised them as her own – greatly improving her reputation and social status as a mother.

== Family ==
Yesugei Baghatur | Hoelun
Belgutei | Behter | Qasar | Hachiun | Temüge | Temüjin (Genghis Khan) | Börte
Jochi | Chagatai | Ögedei | Tolui
Orda | Batu | Berke | Baidar | Guyuk | Kashin | Mongke | Hulegu | Kublai
The Golden Horde | Chagatai Khanate | Ilkhanate | Yuan dynasty

Sons

- Jochi
- Chagatai
- Ögedei
- Tolui

Daughters

- Qojin, the eldest, was betrothed to Tusakha, son of Senggum, and grandson of Wang Khan, ruler of the Keraite tribe; she eventually married Botu, of the Ikires tribe, and widower of her paternal aunt Temulun.
- Alakhai Bekhi, married first to Alaqush Digit Quri, chieftain of the Ongüt tribe; then to his nephew and heir Jingue; and finally to her stepson Boyaohe.
- Tümelün, married to Chigu, son of Alchi, son of Dei Seichen, Börte's father.
- Al Altan, married the powerful Uyghur ruler Barchuk.Shortly after the accession of Güyük Khan in the 1240s, she was tried and executed on charges that were later suppressed.
- Checheikhen, married to Törölchi, son of Quduka beki, of the Oirat tribe.

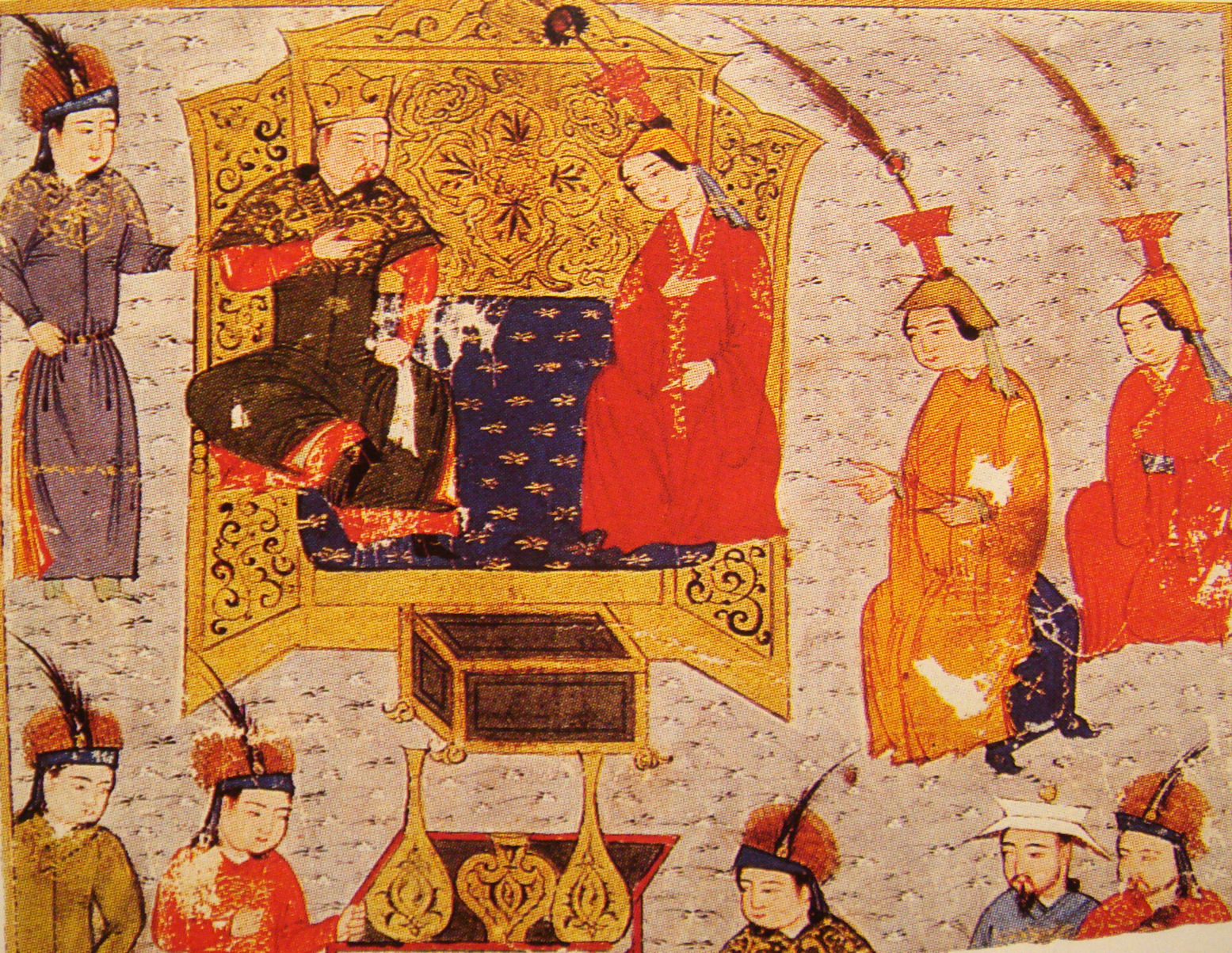
Toloui and his wife Sorghaghtani

Börte and Temüjin placed great faith (and territory) unto their children, also supplying them with considerable wealth and positions to inherit. There was some family conflict over succession; there were doubts about the true father of Jochi, as it is feasible that Börte was raped during her kidnapping and, therefore, that Jochi's father may be one of her captors. Chagatai, Jochi's brother, often chided Jochi for these claims, which often led to quarrels between the two brothers. Temüjin reportedly wholeheartedly denied this accusation, calling them disrespectful and claiming Jochi as his son. As a result of this infighting, Genghis Khan opted for neither Jochi nor Chagatai to take over his legacy as Khan. Instead, Ogodei was selected to rule because he was a peacemaker between his two brothers. Ogodei and Tolui took the reins of their parents’ legacies and their children continued to rule as Khan in many later generations. Both Jochi and Chagatai would also go on to become rulers of territorial divisions, although not the entire empire. Jochi's descendants, for example, would found and rule over the Golden Horde in the west.

== Legacy and modern representations ==
Börte died in 1230, after her husband. Ultimately, throughout her life, Börte earned reverence and respect from the Mongols. She was an admired mother figure for the whole empire, an image which was bolstered by her relationships with both her biological and adopted children. She also cultivated political marriages for her daughters, solidifying diplomatic relations. Throughout history, the Onggiard would use political marriages to ensure amicable relations between the parties involved, with the daughters acting as "intercessors". In this manner, Börte acted both as an advisor to her husband and as a trainer to her daughters, cultivating them to believe in their mission as "representatives, diplomats, and active participants in affairs of state".

Given her significant role in Genghis Khan's life, Börte has appeared as a prominent character in the many films and television series based on her husband's life and conquests. The actresses who have portrayed her include Susan Hayward in The Conqueror, Françoise Dorléac in Genghis Khan and Chuluuny Khulan in the 2007 Oscar-nominated Russian film Mongol. She has also appeared as a playable character in the video game Iron Maiden: Legacy of the Beast, created by the popular metal band of the same name.

== Bibliography ==
- René Grousset. Conqueror of the World: The Life of Chingis-khan (New York: The Viking Press, 1944) ISBN 0-670-00343-3.
- Ratchnevsky, Paul (1991). Genghis Khan: His Life and Legacy. Blackwell Publishing. ISBN 0-631-16785-4.
- Man, John. Genghis Khan: Life, Death and Resurrection (London; New York : Bantam Press, 2004) ISBN 0-593-05044-4.
- Onon, Urgunge, ed. (2005). The secret history of the Mongols; The life and times of Chinggis Khan (Chapter 2) (PDF). Taylor & Francis. ISBN 0-203-98876-0.
- de Rachewiltz, Igor (2006). The secret history of the Mongols : a Mongolian epic chronicle of the thirteenth century. Leiden. ISBN 90-04-15363-2. OCLC 173262183.
- Broadbridge, Anne (2018). Women and the Making of the Mongol Empire. Cambridge University Press. ISBN 978-1-108-34799-0
- May, Timothy (2016). The Mongol Empire: A Historical Encyclopedia. ABC-CLIO. ISBN 978-1-610-69339-4
