= Mongol heartland =

Geographical term

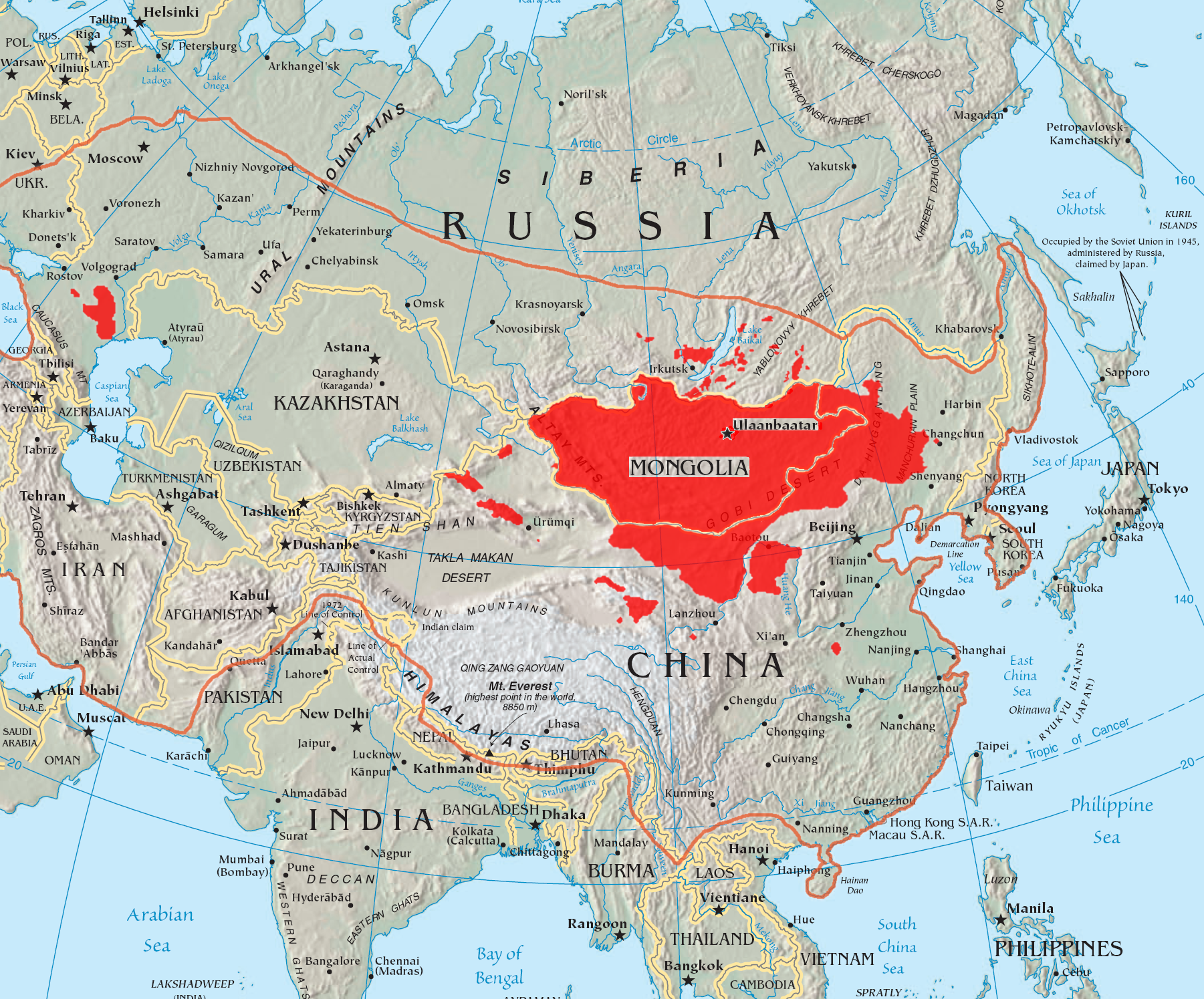
This map shows the boundary of the 13th-century Mongol Empire and location of today's Mongols in modern Mongolia, Russia and China.

The Mongol heartland or Mongolian heartland is the contiguous geographical area in which the Mongol people have primarily lived, particularly as a historiographic term. It is generally considered to comprise the Mongolian Plateau and some adjacent territories, although its exact extent has been changing over the course of history—particularly since the rise of the Mongol Empire in the 13th century. The area is also described as the heartland of the Mongol Empire during its greatest extent, when it stretched from the Sea of Japan in the east to the Middle East and Eastern Europe in the west, making it the largest contiguous land empire in human history.

The modern area that the Mongols live in approximately includes: the modern state of Mongolia; the Inner Mongolia Autonomous Region, along with Dzungaria in Xinjiang and parts of Manchuria, Qinghai, and Ningxia in China; as well as the Buryatia Republic and a few smaller territories in Russia. The Mongolic peoples in this area share the common traditional Mongol culture as well as the Mongol language to varying levels. With the exception of the Mongolian state, all areas in the Mongol heartland have non-Mongol majorities.

== History ==
The Mongol Empire of the 13th and 14th centuries was the largest contiguous land empire in human history. It originated from the Mongol heartland in the East Asian Steppe, when Genghis Khan united the nomadic tribes and became the first Khagan of the Empire in 1206. The Khamag Mongol, a loose Mongolic tribal confederation on the Mongolian Plateau in the 12th century, was founded by Genghis Khan's great-grandfather Khabul Khan and is sometimes considered to be a predecessor state to the Mongol Empire. By the late 13th century the Mongol Empire spanned from the Pacific Ocean in the east to the Danube River and the shores of the Persian Gulf in the west, but the region surrounding the Mongolian Plateau is considered the heartland of the Mongol Empire. Later Kublai Khan (Genghis Khan's grandson and founder of the Yuan dynasty) shifted the political center of gravity from Karakorum in the Mongol heartland to Khanbaliq (modern Beijing) in North China, but the Mongolian Steppe remained a significant place for the Mongol rulers. After the fall of the empire in 1368 the Mongols retreated to the Mongol heartland and continued to hold much of the area as the Northern Yuan, although the Ming dynasty also controlled parts of Inner Mongolia while fighting with the Mongols, and the Ming built a new Great Wall to prevent the Mongols' reconquest of China.

In the 17th century, the Manchu-led Qing dynasty gradually conquered the area with the submission of Ejei Khan in 1635, the last Khan of the Northern Yuan, and the submission of the princes of Khalkha at Dolon Nor in 1691 during the Dzungar–Qing Wars. With the exception of Buryatia and some neighboring territories under the Russian Empire, the Qing dynasty ruled most of the Mongol heartland for over 200 years. During this period, Qing rulers established separate administrative structures for governing Inner Mongolia and Outer Mongolia. While the empire maintained firm control in both Inner and Outer Mongolia, the Mongols in Outer Mongolia (which is further from the capital Beijing) enjoyed a higher degree of autonomy, and also retained their own language and culture during this period. However, the Qing dynasty adopted a sinicization policy towards the Mongol heartland (Inner and Outer Mongolia) since the late 19th century, especially in the late Qing reforms during the last decade of the dynasty, which resulted in drastic change of the Qing policy toward Mongolia from a relatively conservative-protective one to an aggressive-colonial one. Nationalism rose among the Mongols (especially those in Outer Mongolia) by the early 20th century, and with the fall of the Manchu-led Qing dynasty the Mongols in Outer Mongolia declared their independence and established the Bogd Khanate of Mongolia in December 1911. Actual independence from the Republic of China was also achieved in 1921.

In the present day the Mongols primarily live in the Mongolian Plateau, which comprised the majority of the Mongol heartland, in Mongolia, China, and Russia respectively, even though the Mongols now form a minority in most of these areas (except Mongolia). Some Mongols also live in Dzungaria (in China's Xinjiang Uygur Autonomous Region), neighbouring but not part of the Mongolian Plateau, and parts of Qinghai and Ningxia where Oirats reside, as well as parts of Manchuria or Northeast China bordering to Inner Mongolia where Khorchin Mongols reside. The common traditional Mongolian culture is shared by the Mongolic people in this contiguous geographical area to varying degrees, and they usually speak a Mongolic language, which is especially the case for those residing in the state of Mongolia.

== See also ==
- Mongolian Plateau
- Pan-Mongolism
- History of Mongolia
