= Jochi =

Mongol prince and general (c. 1182 – c. 1225)

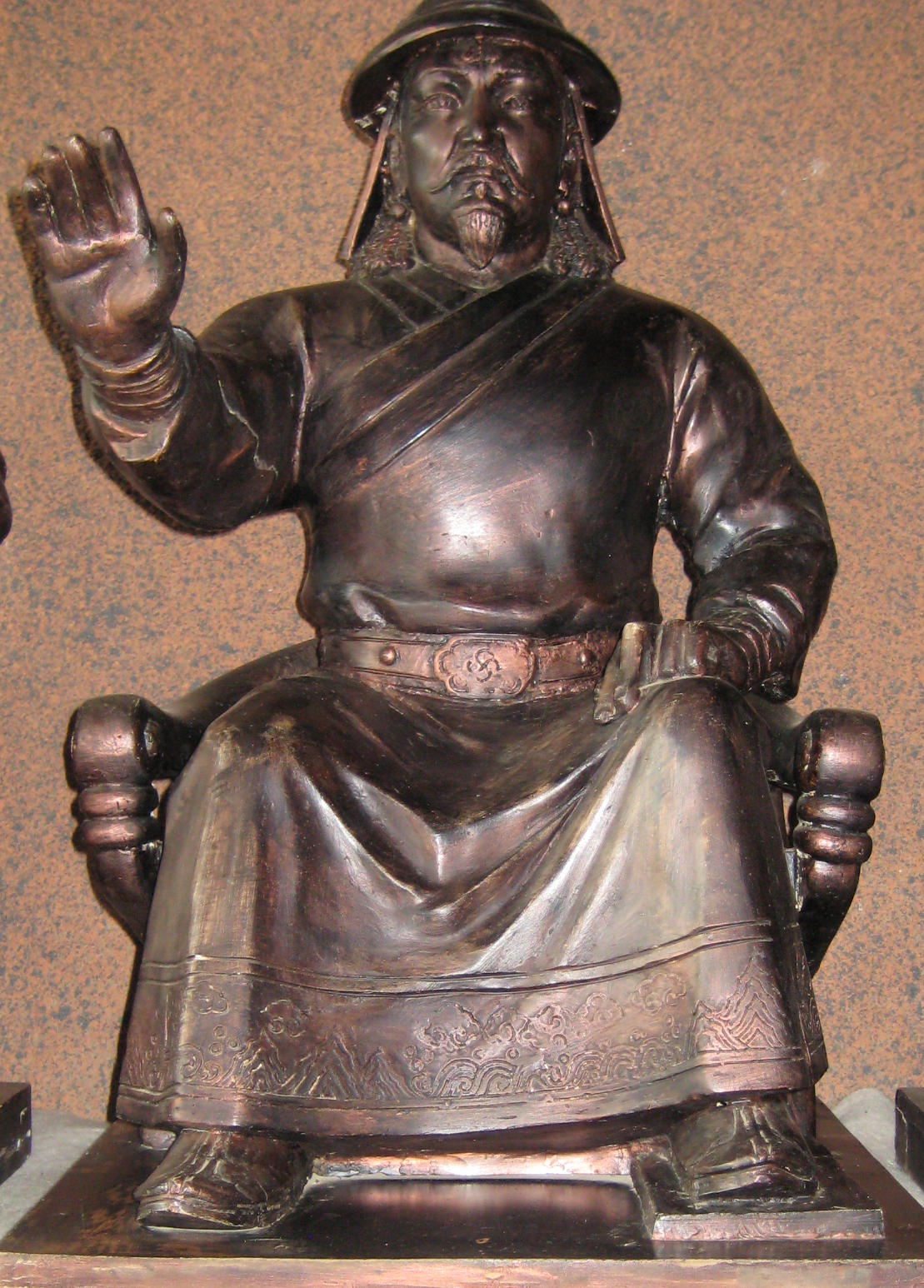
- A statue of Jochi in modern-day Mongolia

Khan of the Ulus of Jochi
- Predecessor: none
- Successor: Orda; Batu
- Born: c. 1182
- Died: c. 1225 (aged 42–43)
- Spouse: Ukhaa Ujin; Sultan Khatun
- Issue: Orda Khan; Batu Khan; Berke Khan others
- Dynasty: Borjigin
- Father: Genghis Khan (officially); Chilger-Bökö (rumoured)
- Mother: Börte
- Military career
- Conflicts: Jochid campaigns in Siberia; Battle of Irtysh River; Mongol conquest of the Jin dynasty; Chem River Battle (possibly); Irghiz River skirmish (unconfirmed); Mongol invasion of the Khwarazmian Empire; Siege of Gurganj

Jochi (Mongolian: ᠵᠦᠴᠢ; c. 1182 – c. 1225), also spelled Jüchi, was a prince of the early Mongol Empire. His life was marked by controversy over the circumstances of his birth and culminated in his estrangement from his family. He was nevertheless a prominent military commander and the progenitor of the family who ruled over the khanate of the Golden Horde.

Jochi was the son of Börte, the first wife of the Mongol leader Temüjin, later known as Genghis Khan. For many months before Jochi's birth, Börte had been a captive of the Merkit tribe, one of whom forcibly married and raped her. Although there was thus considerable doubt over Jochi's parentage, Temüjin considered him his son and treated him accordingly. Many Mongols, most prominently Börte's next son Chagatai, disagreed; these tensions eventually led to both Chagatai and Jochi being excluded from the line of succession to the Mongol throne.

After Temüjin founded the Mongol Empire in 1206 and took the name Genghis Khan, he entrusted Jochi with nine thousand warriors and a large territory in the west of the Mongol heartland; Jochi commanded and participated in numerous campaigns to secure and extend Mongol power in the region. He was also a prominent commander during the invasion of the Khwarazmian Empire (1219–1221), during which he subdued cities and tribes to the north. During the 1221 siege of Gurganj, tensions arose between him, his brothers, and Genghis, which never healed. Jochi was still estranged from his family when he died of ill health c. 1225. His son Batu was appointed to rule his territories in his stead.

== Birth and paternity ==
Jochi's mother, Börte, was born into the Onggirat tribe, who lived along the Greater Khingan mountain range south of the Ergüne river, in modern-day Inner Mongolia. At the age of ten, she was betrothed to a Mongol (Note: At this point in time, the word "Mongols" only referred to the members of one tribe in northeast Mongolia; because this tribe played a central role in the formation of the Mongol Empire, their name was later used for all the tribes.) boy named Temüjin, son of the Mongol chieftain Yesugei. Seven years later (c. 1178), after he had survived a violent adolescence, they married. They had their first child, a daughter named Qojin, in 1179 or 1180. By forming alliances with notable steppe leaders, such as his friend Jamukha and his father's former ally Toghrul, and with the help of his charisma, Temüjin began to attract followers and gain power. Word of his rise spread and soon drew the attention of the Merkit tribe to the northwest, from whom Yesugei had abducted Temüjin's mother Hö'elün, sparking a blood feud; they resolved to take revenge on Yesugei's heir.

Because of their consequences, the subsequent events were considered controversial: most contemporary authors omitted any mention of the events, while the two that did include them (the Secret History of the Mongols, a mid-13th-century epic poem, and the 14th-century Persian historian Rashid al-Din's Jami al-tawarikh) are contradictory. The following narrative, containing elements from both, is considered most plausible. In 1180 or 1181, a large force of Merkits raided Temüjin's camp; while most of his family managed to escape, Börte was captured. She was forcibly married to Chilger-Bökö, the younger brother of Hö'elün's original husband. Meanwhile, Temüjin had convinced his allies to assemble substantial forces to help him rescue Börte. Under Jamukha's command, the combined army campaigned against the Merkits and defeated them, recovering Börte and taking large amounts of plunder.

Börte was heavily pregnant and c. 1182 gave birth to Jochi in Jamukha's camp. As Chilger-Bökö had undoubtedly raped her, and as she had been among the Merkits for nearly nine months, Jochi's paternity was uncertain; this was reflected in his name, meaning "guest" in Mongolian. While Temüjin always regarded Jochi as his son by blood and treated him accordingly, many Mongols, such as his younger brother Chagatai, viewed him as a bastard sired by Chilger-Bökö.

== Marriages and family ==
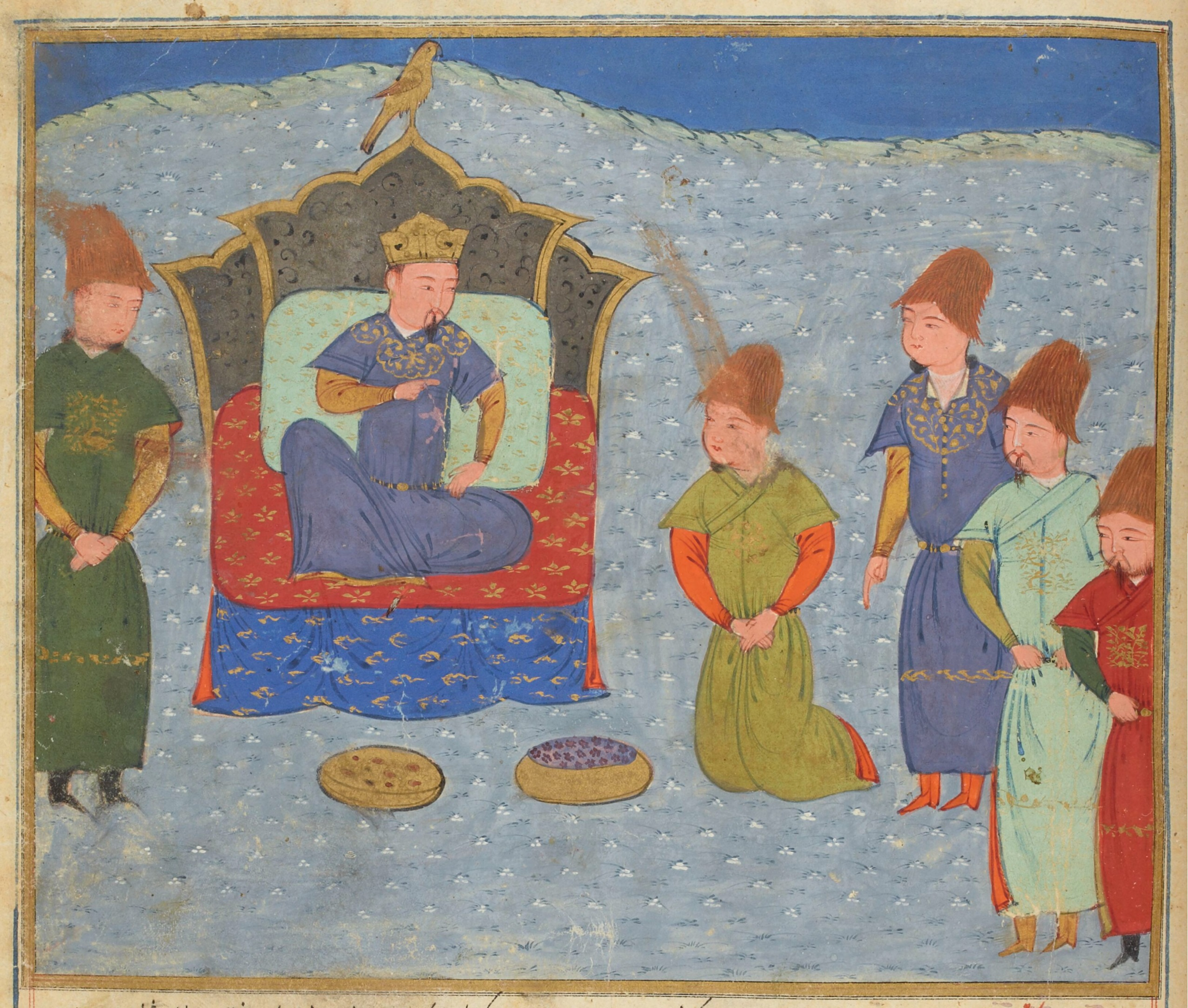
A depiction of Batu Khan, Jochi's second son and eventual successor

Jochi does not reappear in historical sources until 1203. By this time, he was old enough for marriage. Temüjin intended to betroth him to a daughter of his ally Toghrul, but because of Jochi's uncertain birth and Temüjin's comparatively low status, this proposal was taken as insulting by Toghrul's people and eventually led to war between the two leaders. After Toghrul's defeat in 1204, Jochi was given one of his nieces, Begtütmish, as a wife. He also married other women: Börte's niece Öki; her relative Sorghan; and several less powerful women, namely Qutlugh Khatun, Sultan Khatun, Nubqus, Shīr, Qarajin, and Kul. In addition, Jochi took concubines. It is unknown who Jochi's senior wife was, but it was likely either Öki or Sorghan.

Jochi's most important sons were Orda Khan and Batu Khan; they were the children of Sorghan and Öki, respectively. Neither these women nor Begtütmish was the mother of Jochi's other notable son, Berke. The names of eleven other sons are known, but none had significant careers, reflecting the junior status of their mothers. Descendants of younger sons nevertheless used their Jochid lineage to legitimise their right to rule: these included Khiḍr Khan of Shiban's line, and Tokhtamysh who descended from Jochi's youngest son Tuqa-Timur.

== Early commands ==
In 1206, having united the tribes of Mongolia, Temüjin held a large assembly called a kurultai where he was acclaimed as "Genghis Khan". He began to reorder his new nation, dividing it between members of his ruling dynasty. As the eldest son, Jochi received the largest share—nine thousand subject warriors, all with their own families and herds; Chagatai received eight thousand, and their younger brothers Ögedei and Tolui received five thousand each. As expected for a firstborn, Jochi received the territories furthest away from the homeland for his ulus (domain): they were located in western Mongolia along the River Irtysh.

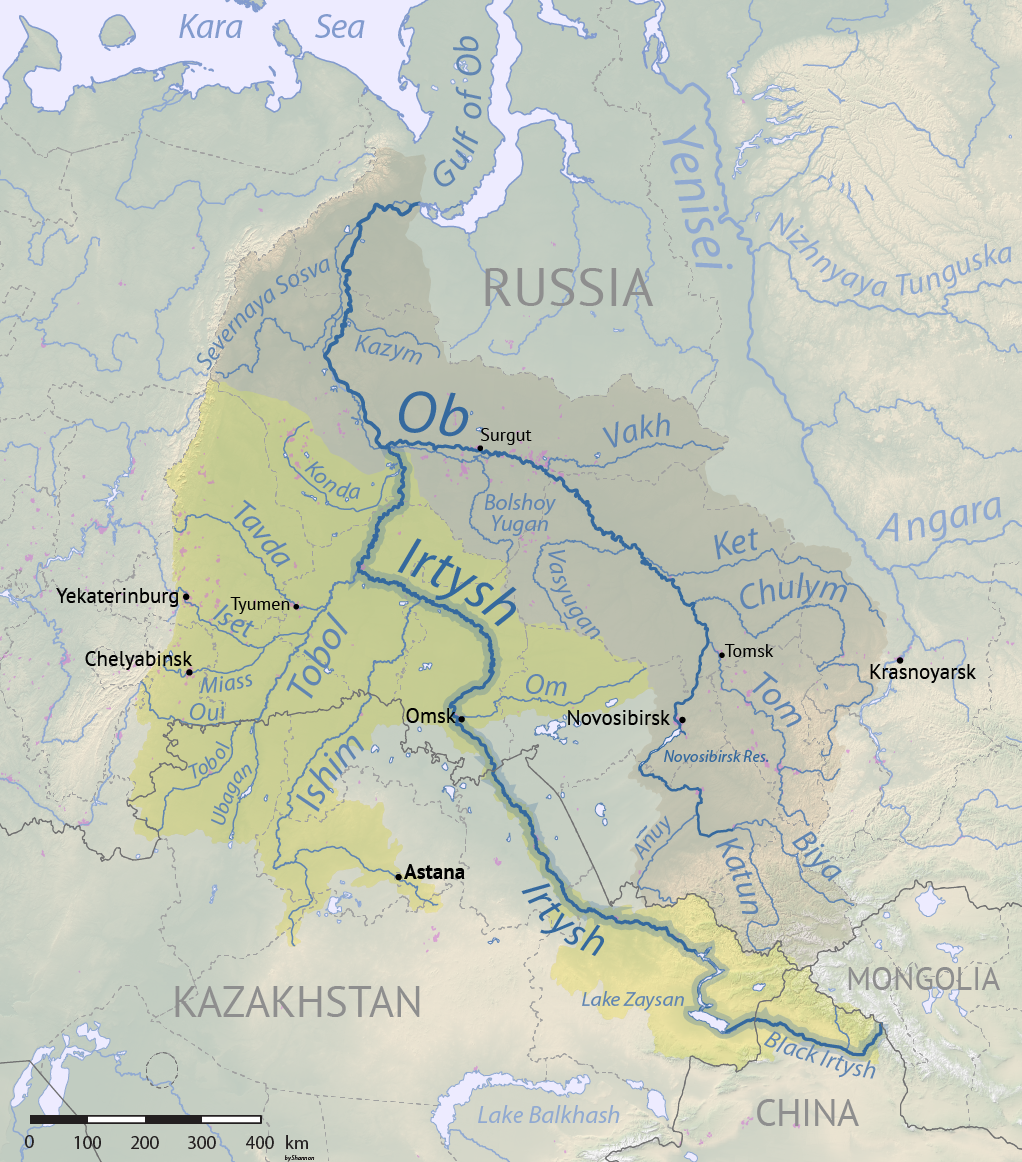
Map of the course of the River Irtysh; Jochi's territories were initially located around its headwaters in the west of the Mongol heartland, but later came to include most of the area depicted on this map.

This allocation was made with the expectation that Jochi would expand his domains, and so in 1207–08 he campaigned against and subjugated the Hoi-yin Irgen, a collection of tribes on the edge of the Siberian taiga between the Angara and Irtysh rivers. Jochi secured a marriage alliance with the Oirats, whose leader Qutuqa Beki guided the Mongols to the Yenisei Kyrgyz and other Hoi-yin Irgen. These tribes soon submitted, and Jochi took control of the region's trade in grain and furs, as well as its gold mines. He subsequently reinforced Subutai's army before it defeated the renegade Merkits at the battle of the Irtysh River in late 1208 or early 1209. Jochi would campaign intermittently against the Merkits and their Qangli allies for the next decade, before finally destroying the last remnants of the people in 1217 or 1218 alongside Subutai at the Chem River Battle. The historian Christopher Atwood has argued that this narrative minimised Jochi's role, that in reality he, not Subutai, was the primary commander in all campaigns against the Merkit and Qangli, and that his right to rule the former Qangli lands was justified by the success of the campaigns.

Alongside his brothers Chagatai and Ögedei, Jochi commanded the right wing in the 1211 invasion of the Chinese Jin dynasty. The Mongols marched southwards from Genghis's campaign headquarters in modern Inner Mongolia in November 1211: first they attacked the cities in the area between Hohhot and Datong, and then they followed the Taihang Mountains into Shanxi, where they pillaged and plundered in autumn 1213. He may have also taken part in the Irghiz River skirmish, an inconclusive engagement fought against the army of Muhammad II of Khwarazm. The Secret History records two conversations between Jochi and his father about his campaigns: once when Genghis declined Jochi's request to spare the life of a renowned Merkit archer, and once when Jochi's triumphant return from the subjugation of the Oirats garnered high praise from his father.

== Khwarazmian war and succession ==
In 1218, Genghis was provoked into launching a campaign against the Central Asian Khwarazmian Empire after a Mongol trade caravan was killed by the governor of the border town of Otrar and subsequent diplomatic overtures failed. According to the Secret History, Yesui, one of Genghis's secondary wives, requested that he decide the succession before setting out. Though Genghis appears not to have cared about Jochi's possible illegitimacy, Chagatai vehemently objected to his brother becoming the next khan, shouting, "How can we let ourselves be ruled by this Merkit bastard?" After a short brawl between the brothers was broken up, the Secret History continues, the suggestion of Ögedei as a compromise candidate was endorsed by both brothers and their father. Other sources record a less febrile gathering taking place after the war's conclusion, so some historians speculate that the Secret History's account was "a later interpolation" and that Jochi only lost his place as heir after making mistakes during the Khwarazmian campaign.

The Khwarazmian Empire c. 1220. Jochi campaigned along the northern border from east to west; when he reached the Aral Sea, he took his army south to besiege Gurganj (marked as Urgench).

The Mongol armies, estimated to number 150,000 or 200,000 men, descended upon Otrar in late 1219. Leaving Chagatai and Ögedei to besiege the town, Genghis took their younger brother Tolui and traversed the Kyzyl Kum desert to attack the city of Bukhara. Meanwhile, Jochi was dispatched to march down the Syr Darya river in the direction of the Khwarazmian capital Gurganj and subdue all the cities en route, which Genghis intended to become part of Jochi's territories. The towns of Sighnaq and Asanas offered particularly stiff resistance, and their inhabitants were thus slaughtered, while Jand and Yanikant were occupied without much trouble. In late 1220, he travelled southwest along the shores of the Aral Sea to Gurganj, while his brothers Chagatai and Ögedei, having captured Otrar, converged on his position.

There are contradictory accounts of the siege of Gurganj and Jochi's part in it. What is certain is that the siege was lengthy, lasting between four and seven months, and that it was exceptionally fierce: the defiant Khwarazmian defenders forced the Mongol army to engage in bitter house-by-house urban warfare, with much of the city destroyed either by burning naphtha or flooding from collapsed dams. After the city's fall in 1221, its inhabitants were either killed or enslaved.

The usual narrative of the siege recounts that Jochi and Chagatai quarrelled on how best to conduct its progress, as Jochi presumed that the rich city would become part of his domain and wished to damage it as little as possible. Chagatai, on the other hand, held no such qualms. When Genghis heard about this infighting, he ordered that Ögedei be promoted to command his brothers. Atwood argues that this narrative was a later invention designed to buttress Ögedei's rule as khan of the empire and that Jochi in reality retained primacy throughout the siege.

== Death and legacy ==
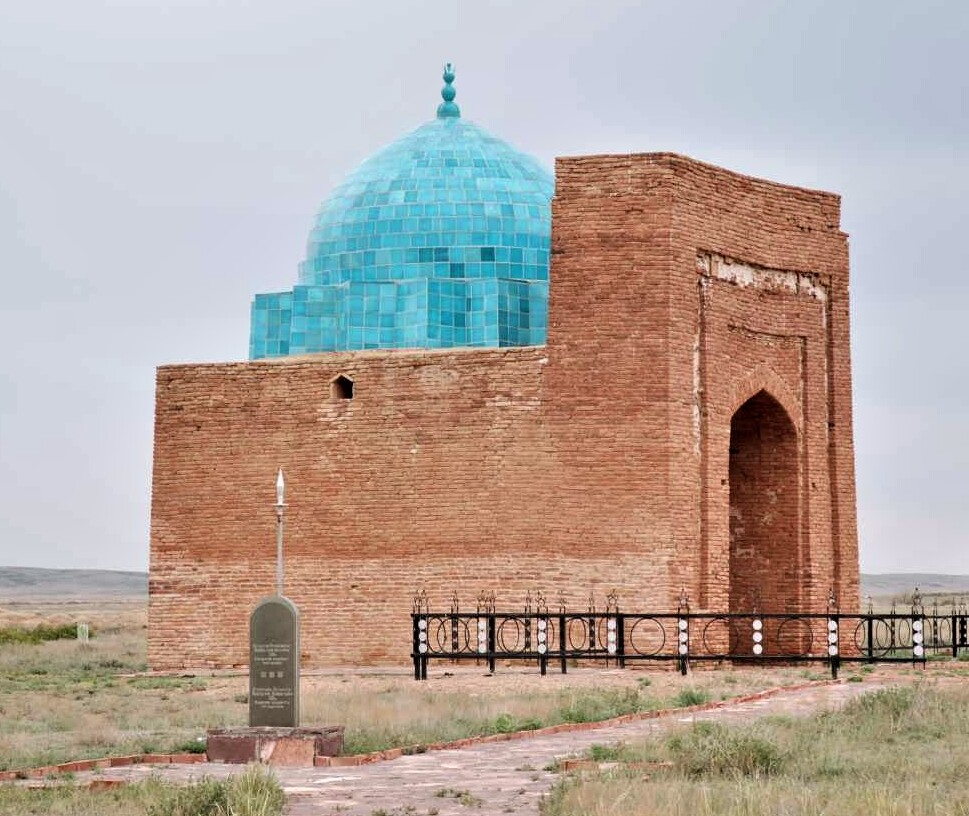
The "Jochi Mausoleum" in Kazakhstan has traditionally been identified as Jochi's burial place, but this is likely untrue

Regardless of the narrative discrepancies, Jochi lost the favour of his father following the siege. Genghis likely considered it a military failure on account of its length and destruction; Jochi also erred by not sending his father his rightful share of the loot. After its conclusion, Chagatai and Ögedei departed southwards to join their father in his pursuit of the renegade Khwarazmian prince Jalal al-Din, while Jochi moved north, ostensibly to bring the Qangli to heel in his new territories, which included the steppes west of the river Chu. Some sources allege that he preferred to spend his time hunting, an activity he was very greatly fond of. It is unclear if he ever met his father again.

Although Jochi sent huge numbers of wild asses and 20,000 white horses to Genghis as a gift c. 1224, relations were steadily worsening because of Jochi's preoccupation with his territories. On his return home, Genghis ordered Jochi to join him, but the latter claimed he was too ill to do so. When a traveller claimed that he was not ill and merely hunting, Genghis resolved to bring him to heel. Before he could do so, in either 1225 or 1227, (Note: Sources for 1225: Sources for 1227:) news came that Jochi had died of his illness. One account, likely fabricated, states that Jochi had been so offended by the destruction at Gurganj that he had made a secret alliance with the Khwarazmians, and that having found out, Genghis ordered that Jochi be poisoned.

Batu was confirmed as ruler of his father's territories by Genghis—his elder brother Orda assumed a junior position, while their younger brothers each took a strip of land to rule. Jochi's descendants would grow more independent, eventually ruling over the state known as the Golden Horde. Although a large mausoleum in Ulytau Region in Kazakhstan has traditionally been identified as the resting place of Jochi's remains, radiocarbon dating indicates that it was built much later and that it is not the site of the grave.
