= Alakhai Bekhi =

Daughter of Chinggis Khan

Alakhai Bekhi (Alagai Bäki; c. 1191 – after 1230) was the third daughter of Genghis Khan and his first wife Börte. She acted as Regent of the territories in China proper conquered by her father after he withdrew to the Mongolian Plateau in 1215.

== Life ==
In 1206, the Ongud allies of Genghis Khan attended his great Kurultai and brought gifts from their lands. In recognition of their loyalty, Alakhai was betrothed to a relative, perhaps the son, of Alaqush of the Ongud. When she was about sixteen years old, she went south of the Gobi Desert, where the Ongud lived a semi-nomad life. This gave Genghis Khan a foothold beyond the Gobi Desert, where many sedentary kingdoms of large populations were located. Alakhai Beki supplied the Mongols with horses and provisions, whenever they came south.

In 1211, the Ongud revolted against Alakhai and tried to kill her. She managed to escape, but her husband and other supporters were killed. She took two of her stepsons with her to the Mongol army. Genghis Khan then sent part of his army with her and the revolt was suppressed. Though Genghis planned on the widescale killing of male Onguds in retaliation, Alakhai persuaded him to only punish the murderers of her husband. After that Alakhai married her stepson Jingue and the Ongud remained loyal to her and Genghis Khan.

She was also left in charge of the territories in China proper conquered by her father after he withdrew back to the Mongolian Plateau in 1215. He gave her the title "Princess Who Runs the State". She regularly dispatched troops to aid her father in campaigns.

In 1212, after Jingue's death, she married Boyaohe, another stepson. They had a son named Negudei and Chakhu. Negudei died in battle in the 1230s. She then worked to promote the interests of her grandchildren by arranging marriages for them to women of the Borjigin clan.

Alakhai promoted literacy and, according to a Chinese envoy, read daily. Medicine and religious texts in particular held her interest. Alakhai had a nephew named Mongke.
