= Mongol Empire =

Empire in Eurasia (1206–1368)

Mongol Empire ᠶᠡᠬᠡ ᠮᠣᠩᠭᠣᠯ ᠤᠯᠤᠰ Yeke Mongɣol Ulus (Middle Mongol)
- 1206–1368
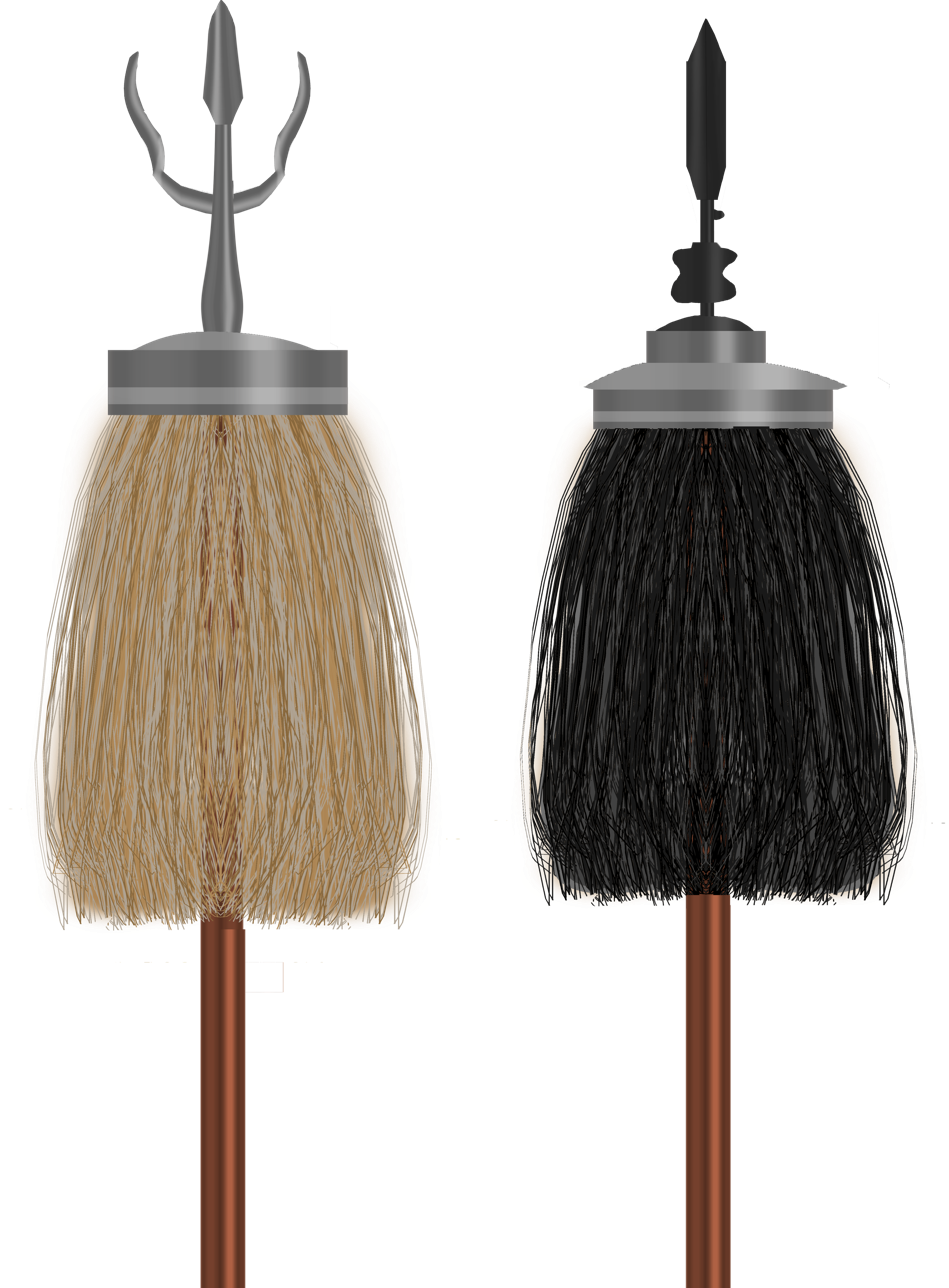
- Standards (tugs) of Genghis Khan

- Expansion of the Mongol Empire across Eurasia between 1206 and 1294, with modern political boundaries superimposed Mongol Empire Golden Horde Chagatai Khanate Ilkhanate Yuan dynasty
- Status: Nomadic empire
- Capital: Avarga (1206–1235); Karakorum (1235–1271)
- Common languages: Middle Mongol; Turkic languages (Note: Especially western Kipchak dialects in the Golden Horde, Chagatai in the Chagatai Khanate and Old Uyghur in the Yuan dynasty.); Chinese; Persian; others
- Demonym: Mongol
- Government: Elective monarchy; Later also hereditary
- Khagan
  - 1206–1227: Genghis Khan (first)
  - 1229–1241: Ögedei Khan
  - 1246–1248: Güyük Khan
  - 1251–1259: Möngke Khan
  - 1260–1294: Kublai Khan (nominal)

Area
- 1206: 4,000,000 km^{2} (1,500,000 sq mi)
- 1227: 13,500,000 km^{2} (5,200,000 sq mi)
- 1294: 23,500,000 km^{2} (9,100,000 sq mi)
- Currency: Various (Note: Including coins such as dirhams and paper currencies based on silver (sukhe), silk, or the later small amounts of Chinese coins and paper Jiaochao currency of the Yuan dynasty.)
Succeeded by
Golden Horde
Chagatai Khanate
Ilkhanate
Yuan Dynasty

The Mongol Empire was the largest contiguous empire in history. Originating in present-day Mongolia in East Asia, the medieval empire at its height stretched from the Sea of Japan to Eastern Europe, extending northward into Siberia and east and southward into the Indian subcontinent, mounting invasions of Southeast Asia, and conquering the Iranian plateau; and reaching westward as far as the Levant and the Carpathian Mountains.

The empire emerged from the unification of several nomadic tribes in the Mongol heartland under the leadership of Temüjin, known by the title of Genghis Khan (c. 1162–1227), whom a council proclaimed as the ruler of all Mongols in 1206. The empire grew rapidly under his rule and that of his descendants, who sent out invading armies in every direction. The vast transcontinental empire connected the East with the West, and the Pacific to the Mediterranean, in an enforced Pax Mongolica, allowing the exchange of trade, technologies, commodities, and ideologies across Eurasia.

The empire began to split due to wars over succession, as the grandchildren of Genghis Khan disputed whether the royal line should follow from his son and initial heir Ögedei, or from one of his other sons, such as Tolui, Chagatai, or Jochi. The Toluids prevailed after a bloody purge of the Ögedeid and Chagatayid factions, but disputes continued among the descendants of Tolui. The conflict over whether the empire would adopt a sedentary, cosmopolitan lifestyle, or continue its nomadic, steppe-based way of life was a major factor in the breakup.

After Möngke Khan died in 1259, rival kurultai councils simultaneously elected different successors, the brothers Ariq Böke and Kublai Khan, who fought each other in the Toluid Civil War (1260–1264) and dealt with challenges from the descendants of other sons of Genghis. Kublai successfully took power, but war ensued as he sought unsuccessfully to regain control of the Chagatayid and Ögedeid families. By Kublai's death in 1294, the empire had fractured into four separate khanates or empires, each pursuing its own objectives: the Golden Horde khanate in the northwest, the Chagatai Khanate in Central Asia, the Ilkhanate in Iran, and the Yuan dynasty in China, based in modern-day Beijing. In 1304, during the reign of Temür, the three western khanates accepted the suzerainty of the Yuan dynasty.

The Ilkhanate was the first to fall, which disintegrated between 1335 and 1353. Next, the Yuan dynasty lost control of the Tibetan Plateau and China proper in 1354 and 1368, respectively, and collapsed after its capital Dadu was taken over by Ming forces. The Genghisid rulers of the Yuan then retreated north and continued to rule the Mongolian Plateau. The regime is thereafter known as the Northern Yuan dynasty, surviving as a rump state until the conquest by the Qing dynasty in the 1630s. The Golden Horde had broken into competing khanates by the end of the 15th century, and its rule on Eastern Europe is traditionally considered to have ended in 1480 with the Great Stand on the Ugra River by the Grand Duchy of Moscow, while the Chagatai Khanate lasted until 1687, or, in the Yarkent Khanate's case, until 1705.

== Name ==
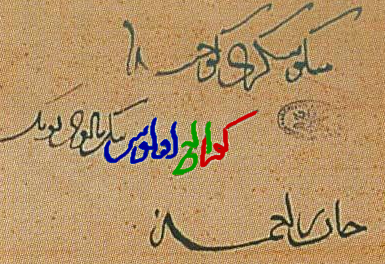
The empire's Turkic name, kür uluγ ulus, in the letter from Güyük Khan to Pope Innocent IV

The Mongol Empire is also referred to as the "Mongolian Empire" or the "Mongol World Empire" in some English sources.

The empire referred to itself as the Nation of the Great Mongols or the Great Mongol Nation (ᠶᠡᠬᠡ
ᠮᠣᠩᠭᠣᠯ
ᠤᠯᠤᠰ, yeke mongɣol ulus) in Mongol or the Whole Great Nation (کور الغ اولوس, kür uluγ ulus) in Turkic.

After the 1260 to 1264 succession war between Kublai Khan and his brother Ariq Böke, Kublai's power became limited to the eastern part of the empire, centered on China. Kublai officially issued an imperial edict on 18 December 1271 to give the empire the Han-style dynastic name of "Great Yuan" (Dai Yuan, or Dai Ön Ulus; Chinese: 大元; pinyin: Dà Yuán) and to establish the Yuan dynasty. Some sources give the full Mongol name as Dai Ön Yehe Monggul Ulus.

== Background ==
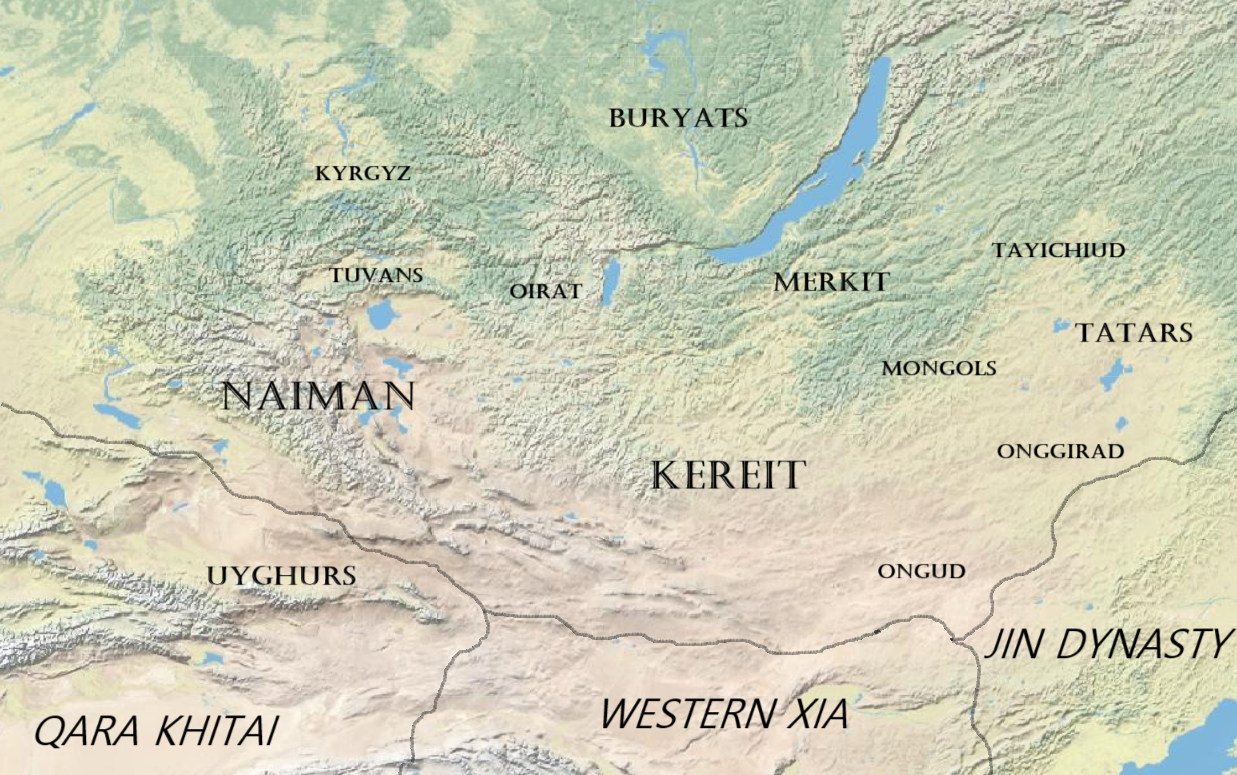
The major tribes of the Mongolian plateau and nearby polities in the mid-12th century

The predecessors of the Mongol tribe were first recorded in the late tenth century, as they migrated from eastern Manchuria into the Mongolian Plateau, where they settled southeast of Lake Baikal near the mountain Burkhan Khaldun. During the twelfth century, the Mongols rose to prominence as its khans made allies and led raids on the Chinese Jin dynasty. The killing of the khans Qutula and Ambaghai in the 1160s ended this first confederation. The Mongols were reduced to comparative penury; other tribes, such as the Naimans in the west of the plateau and Kerait in the centre, became much more powerful, while the Mongols competed with smaller tribes like the Merkit and the Tatars, the allies of the Jin, (Note: A policy of divide and rule—"using barbarians to control barbarians"—had been standard for hundreds of years in China. Although the Tatars betrayed Ambaghai to his humiliating death at the hands of the Jin—being nailed to a wooden donkey— the collapse of his coalition allowed the Tatars to flourish unchecked, to the irritation of the Jin, who had to wait decades for a potent rival to arise. They had to make do with annual campaigns into the steppe to "thin the ranks" by capturing slaves.) in the east and north.

One nephew of Qutula Khan, named Yesugei, had some success fighting against the Tatars, and was a great friend of Toghrul, the khan of the Kerait. With his wife Hö'elün, whom he had abducted from her previous Merkit husband, Yesugei had several children, including a boy named Temüjin (the future Genghis Khan) who was born c. 1162. (Note: The year of Temüjin's birth is disputed, as historians favour different dates: 1155, 1162 or 1167. Some traditions place his birth in the Year of the Pig, which was either 1155 or 1167. While a dating to 1155 is supported by the writings of both Zhao Hong and Rashid al-Din, other major sources such as the History of Yuan and the Shengwu favour the year 1162, which the Mongolian state also recognises for political purposes. The 1167 dating, favoured by the sinologist Paul Pelliot, is derived from a minor source—a text of the Yuan artist Yang Weizhen—but is more compatible with the events of Genghis Khan's life than a 1155 placement, which implies that he did not have children until after the age of thirty and continued actively campaigning into his seventh decade. 1162 is the date accepted by most historians; the historian Paul Ratchnevsky noted that Temüjin himself may not have known the truth.)

A 1278 portrait of Genghis Khan

Yesugei was poisoned by Tatars when Temüjin was still young and Hö'elün's family were abandoned by their tribe on the steppe. They survived the hostility of other tribes and the dangers of the steppe itself, while Temüjin killed his older half-brother to secure his familial position. As an adult, Temüjin formed alliances with his father's ally Toghrul and an old friend named Jamukha who was now leader of his own tribe; they worked together to retrieve Temüjin's newlywed wife Börte, who had been kidnapped by Merkit raiders in retaliation for Hö'elün's abduction. Börte was retrieved successfully but because she had been raped in captivity, the paternity of her son Jochi was uncertain. With Temüjin, she had three more sons named Chagatai, Ögedei, and Tolui, and five daughters named Qojin, Checheyigen, Alaqa, Tümelün, and Al-Altan.

The victory over the Merkit brought Temüjin prestige and a considerable following; although he and Jamukha initially remained close, their individual ambitions soon conflicted and turned hostile. In 1187, Jamukha decisively defeated Temüjin, who took refuge in China. Sponsored by the Jin, he returned to the steppe in 1196 and led a successful campaign with Toghrul against the Tatars in 1196, which re-established his prestige. Temüjin and Toghrul steadily increased their power over the next five years, culminating in a 1201 victory over a coalition led by Jamukha. In 1202, Temüjin eradicated the Tatars; this left the Mongols as the preeminent power in eastern Mongolia. Relations with Toghrul ruptured in 1203, but Temüjin managed to avoid utter defeat and overcome Toghrul. The Naimans were subjugated and Jamukha was executed in the next two years. With these victories, Temüjin became the undisputed ruler of not only Mongolia, but a newly unified people.

== United Mongol Empire (1206–1260) ==
=== Early organization ===
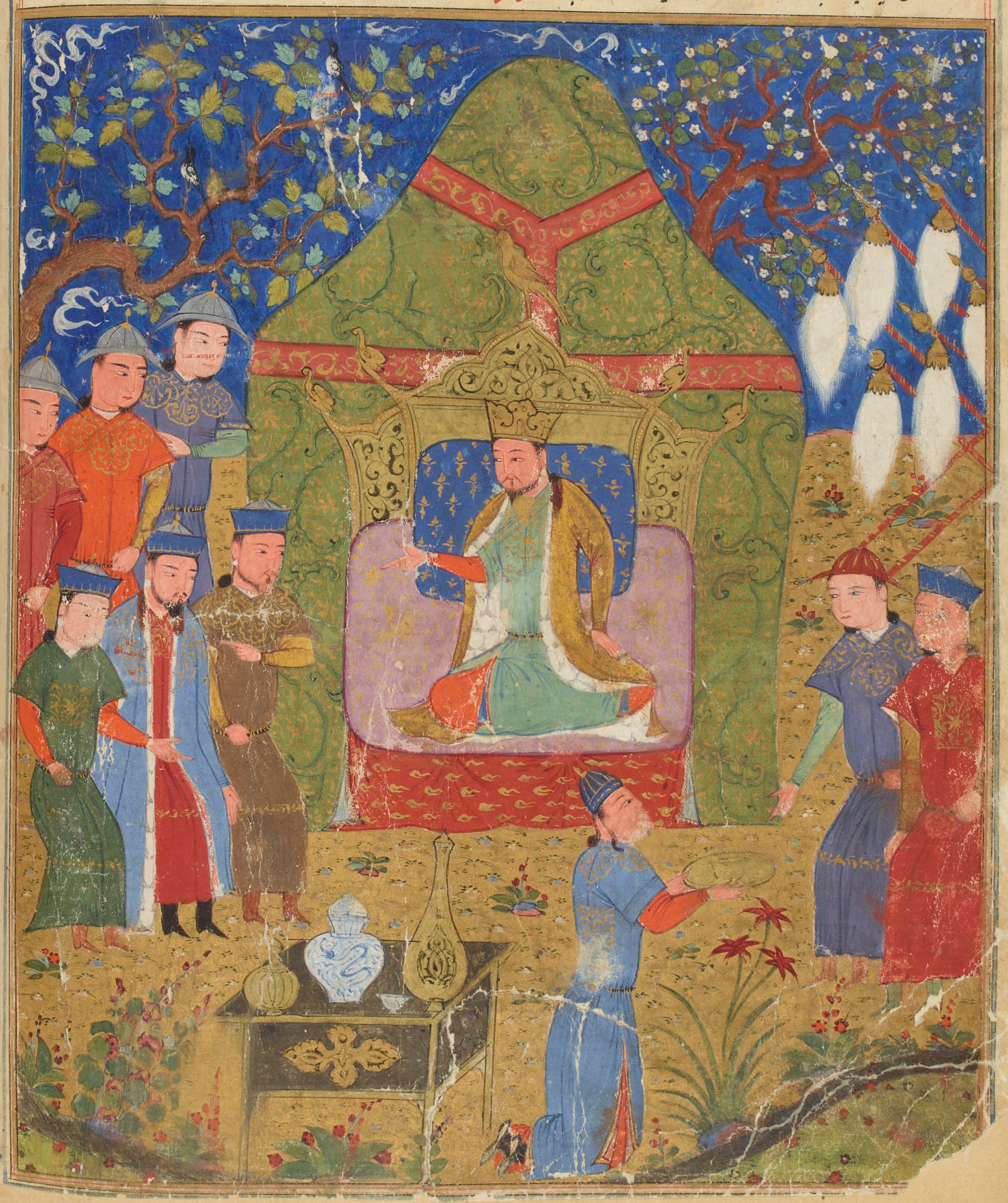
Temüjin being proclaimed as Genghis Khan, as illustrated in a 15th-century Jami' al-tawarikh manuscript (Note: The tuq, a banner fashioned from the tails of yaks or horses, is placed on the right; the white tuq pictured here represent peace, while a black tuq would represent war.)

At a kurultai (assembly) in 1206, the shaman Teb Tenggeri proclaimed Temüjin khan of the "Great Mongol Nation" (Yeke Mongghol Ulus). (Note: Alternative translations include "Great Mongol Empire" and "Great Mongol State".) Here Temüjin assumed the title Genghis Khan, the meaning of which is not certain. (Note: Some commentators hold that the title had no meaning, simply representing Temüjin's eschewal of the traditional gurkhan title, which had been accorded to Jamukha and was thus of lesser worth. Another theory suggests that the word "Genghis" bears connotations of strength, firmness, hardness, or righteousness. A third hypothesis proposes that the title is related to the Turkic tängiz ('ocean'), the title "Genghis Khan" would mean "master of the ocean", and as the ocean was believed to surround the earth, the title thus ultimately implied "Universal Ruler".) He then instituted a series of institutional reforms which constituted, according to the historian Timothy May, a "social revolution". Genghis reconstituted steppe society by redistributing the tribal peoples into "a military-industrial complex" (May) based on the decimal system. His favoured followers—some of whom were of low birth—were allocated to command ninety-five minqad (sing. minkan), or units of a thousand, which were in turn subdivided into hundreds and tens.

Compared to the units he gave to his loyal companions, those assigned to his own family members were relatively few. He proclaimed a new code of law of the empire, Ikh Zasag or Yassa; later he expanded it to cover much of the everyday life and political affairs of the nomads. He forbade the selling of women, theft, fighting among the Mongols, and the hunting of animals during the breeding season.

He appointed his stepbrother Shikhikhutug as supreme judge (jarughachi), ordering him to keep records of the empire. In addition to laws regarding family, food, and the army, Genghis decreed religious freedom and supported domestic and international trade. He exempted the poor and the clergy from taxation. He also encouraged literacy and the adaptation of the Uyghur script into what would become the Mongolian script of the empire, ordering the Uyghur Tata-tonga, who had previously served the khan of Naimans, to instruct his sons.

==== Push into Central Asia ====
Tribal confederations of the Mongolian steppe (c. 12th century)

Genghis quickly came into conflict with the Jin dynasty of the Jurchens and the Western Xia of the Tanguts in northern China. He also had to deal with two other powers, Tibet and Qara Khitai.

Before his death, Genghis Khan divided his empire among his sons and immediate family, making the Empire the joint property of the entire imperial family who, along with the Mongol aristocracy, constituted the ruling class. Genghis arranged for the Chinese Taoist master Qiu Chuji to visit him in Afghanistan, and gave his subjects the right to religious freedom, despite his own shamanistic beliefs.

=== Death of Genghis Khan and expansion under Ögedei (1227–1241) ===
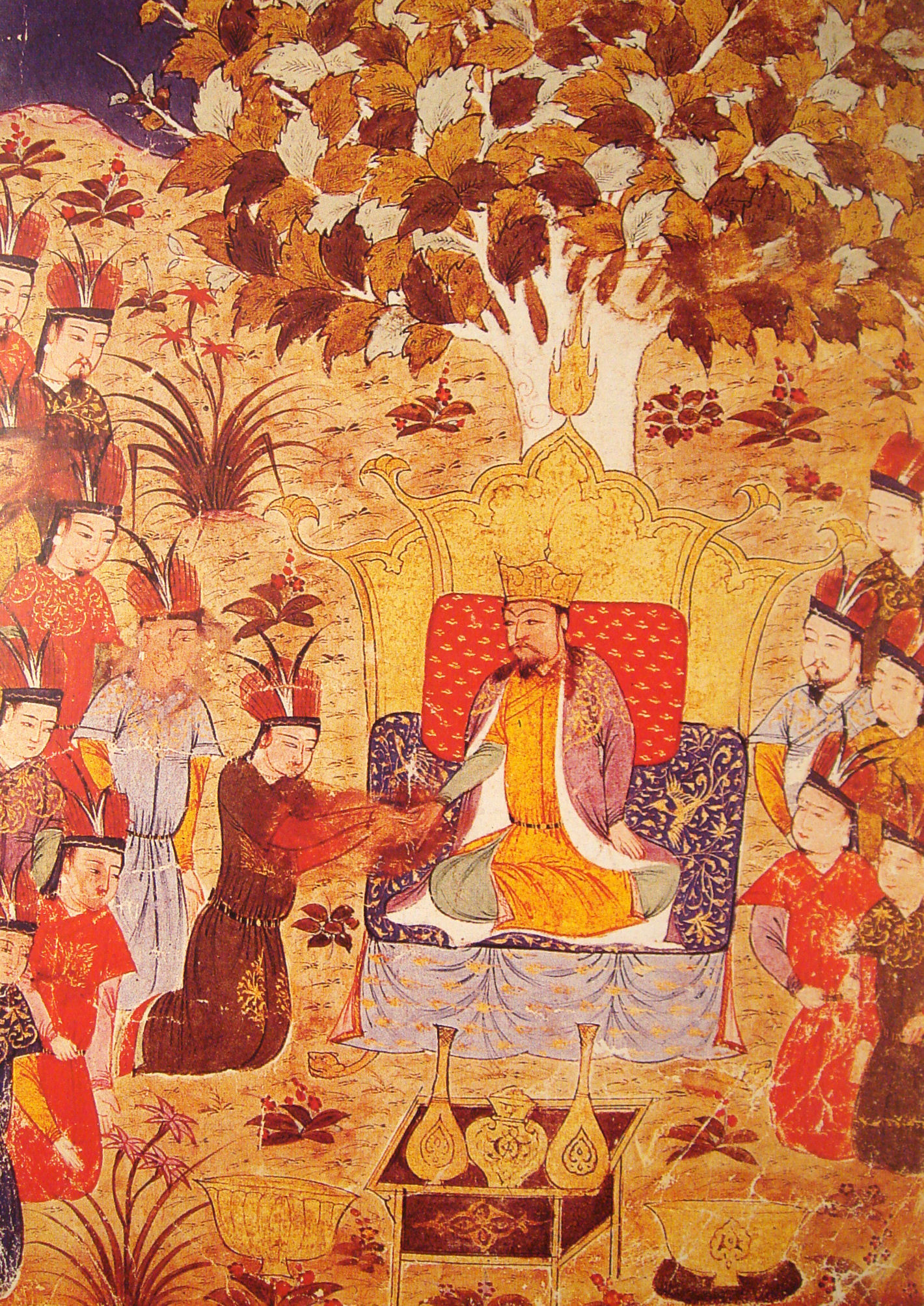
Coronation of Ögedei Khan in 1229 as the successor of Genghis Khan. By Rashid al-Din, early 14th century.

Genghis Khan died on 18 August 1227, by which time the Mongol Empire ruled from the Pacific Ocean to the Caspian Sea, twice the size of the Roman Empire or Umayyad Caliphate at their height, and the largest contiguous state in history. Genghis named his third son, the charismatic Ögedei, as his heir. According to Mongol tradition, Genghis Khan was buried in a secret location. The regency was originally held by Ögedei's younger brother Tolui until Ögedei's formal election at the kurultai in 1229.

Among his first actions Ögedei sent troops to subjugate the Bashkirs, Bulgars, and other nations in the Kipchak-controlled steppes. In the east, Ögedei's armies re-established Mongol authority in Manchuria, crushing the Eastern Xia regime and the Water Tatars. In 1230, the great Khan personally led his army in the campaign against the Jin dynasty of China. Ögedei's general Subutai captured the capital of Emperor Wanyan Shouxu in the siege of Kaifeng in 1232. The Jin dynasty collapsed in 1234 when the Mongols captured Caizhou, the town to which Wanyan Shouxu had fled. In 1234, three armies commanded by Ögedei's sons Kochu and Koten and the Tangut general Chagan invaded southern China. With the assistance of the Song dynasty, the Mongols finished off the Jin in 1234.

In the west, Ögedei's general Chormaqan destroyed Jalal al-Din Mangburni, the last shah of the Khwarazmian Empire. The small kingdoms in southern Persia voluntarily accepted Mongol supremacy. In East Asia, there were a number of Mongol campaigns into Goryeo Korea, but Ögedei's attempt to annex the Korean Peninsula met with little success. Gojong, the king of Goryeo, surrendered but later revolted and massacred Mongol darughachis (overseers); he then moved his imperial court from Gaeseong to Ganghwa Island.

In 1235, the Mongols established Karakorum as their capital lasting until 1260. During that period, Ögedei Khan ordered the construction of a palace within the surrounding of its walls.

==== Invasions of Kievan Rus' and China ====
Meanwhile, in an offensive action against the Song dynasty, Mongol armies captured Siyang-yang, the Yangtze and Sichuan, but did not secure their control over the conquered areas. The Song generals were able to recapture Siyang-yang from the Mongols in 1239. After the sudden death of Ögedei's son Kochu in Chinese territory, the Mongols withdrew from southern China, although Kochu's brother Prince Koten invaded Tibet immediately after their withdrawal.

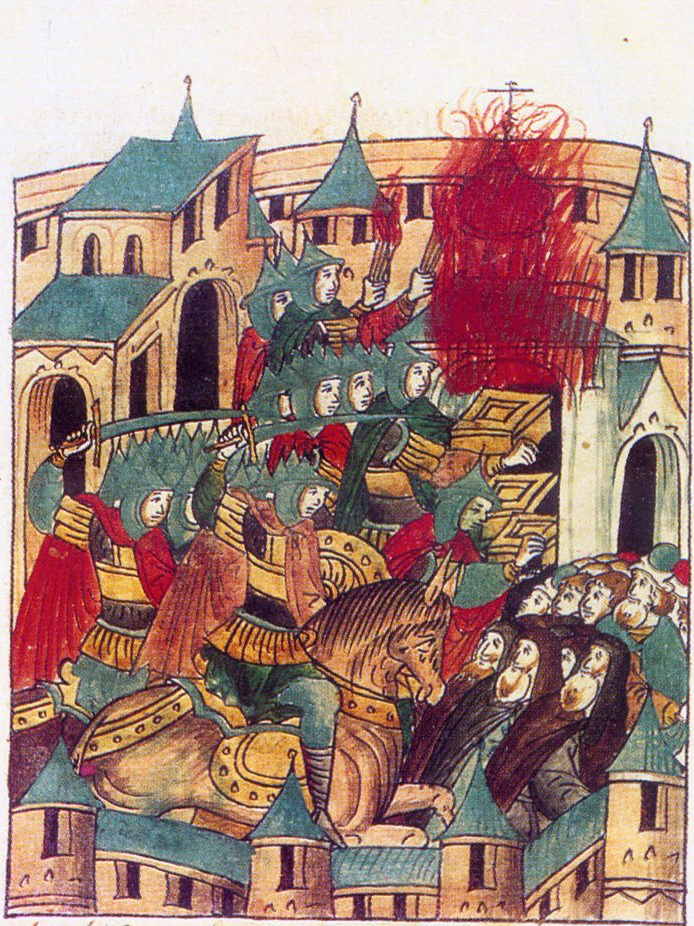
The sack of Suzdal by Batu Khan in 1238, miniature from a 16th-century chronicle

Batu Khan, another grandson of Genghis Khan, overran the territories of the Bulgars, Alans, Kipchaks, Bashkirs, Mordvins, Chuvash, and other nations of the southern Russian steppe. By 1237, the Mongols were encroaching upon Ryazan, the first Kievan Rus' principality they were to attack. After a three-day siege involving fierce fighting, the Mongols captured the city and massacred its inhabitants. They then proceeded to destroy the army of the Grand Principality of Vladimir at the Battle of the Sit River.

The Mongols captured the Alania capital Maghas in 1238. By 1240, all Kievan Rus' had fallen to the Asian invaders except for a few northern cities. Mongol troops under Chormaqan in Persia, connecting his invasion of Transcaucasia with the invasion of Batu and Subutai, forced the Georgian and Armenian nobles to surrender as well.

Despite the military successes, strife continued within the Mongol ranks. Batu's relations with Güyük, Ögedei's eldest son, and Büri, the beloved grandson of Chagatai Khan, remained tense and worsened during Batu's victory banquet in southern Kievan Rus'. Nevertheless, Güyük and Buri could not do anything to harm Batu's position as long as his uncle Ögedei was still alive. Ögedei continued with offensives into the Indian subcontinent, temporarily investing Uchch, Lahore, and Multan of the Delhi Sultanate and stationing a Mongol overseer in Kashmir, though the invasions into India eventually failed and were forced to retreat. In northeastern Asia, Ögedei agreed to end the conflict with Goryeo by making it a client state and sent Mongol princesses to wed Goryeo princes. He then reinforced his kheshig with the Koreans through both diplomacy and military force.

==== Push into Central Europe ====
The advance into Europe continued with Mongol invasions of Poland and Hungary. When the western flank of the Mongols plundered Polish cities, a European alliance among the Poles, the Moravians, and the Christian military orders of the Hospitallers, Teutonic Knights, and the Templars assembled sufficient forces to halt, albeit briefly, the Mongol advance at Legnica.

The Hungarian army, their Croatian allies and the Knights Templar were beaten by the Mongols at the banks of the Sajo River on 11 April 1241. Before Batu's forces could continue on to Vienna and northern Albania, news of Ögedei's death in December 1241 brought a halt to the invasion. As was customary in Mongol military tradition, all princes of Genghis's line had to attend the kurultai to elect a successor.

Batu and his western Mongol army withdrew from Central Europe the next year. Today researchers doubt that Ögedei's death was the sole reason for the Mongol's withdrawal. Batu did not return to Mongolia, so a new khan was not elected until 1246. Climatic and environmental factors, as well as the strong fortifications and castles of Europe, played an important role in the Mongols' decision to withdraw.

=== Post-Ögedei power struggles (1241–1251) ===
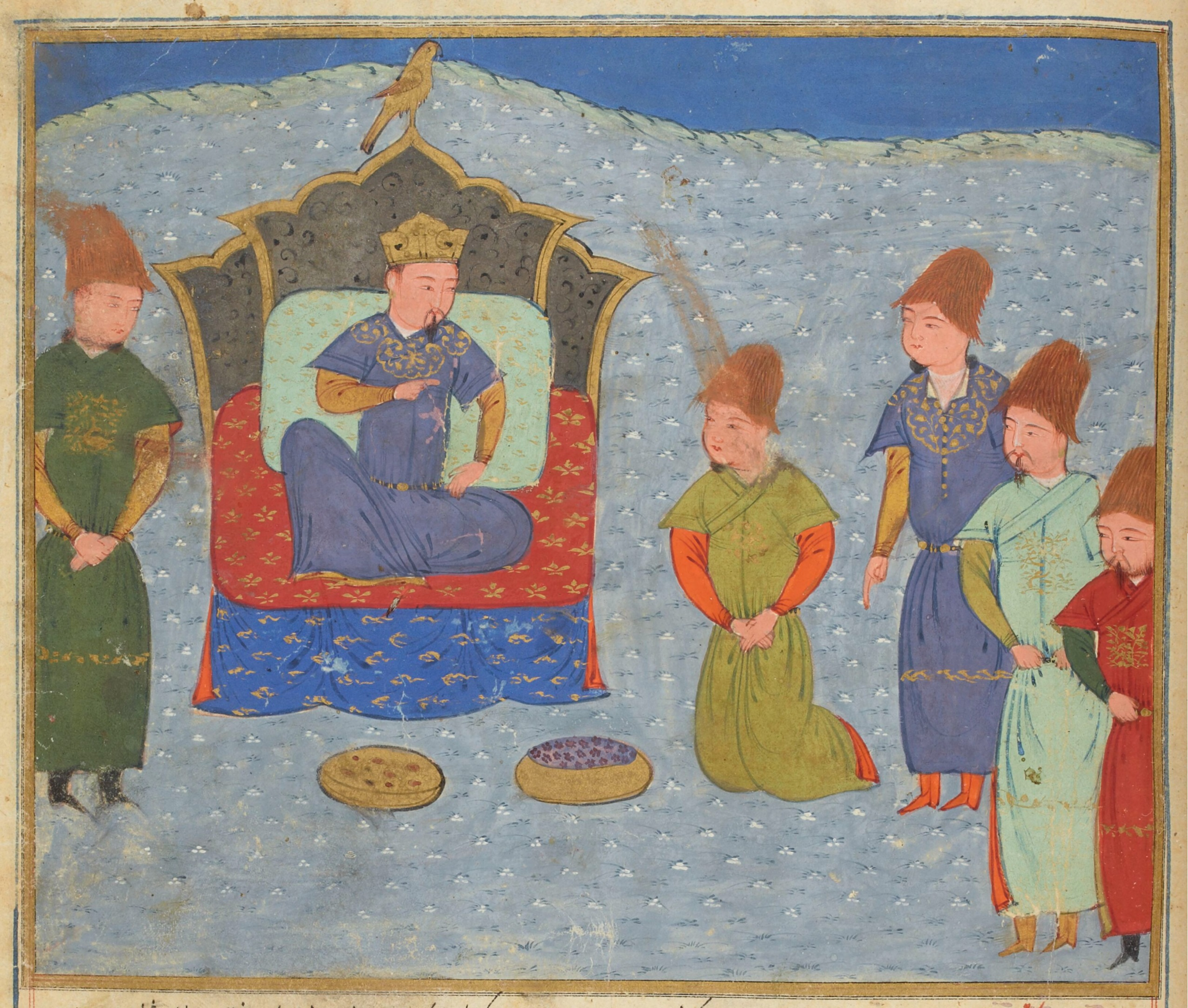
Batu Khan on the throne of the Golden Horde

Following the Great Khan Ögedei's death in 1241, and before the next kurultai, Ögedei's widow Töregene took over the empire. She persecuted her husband's Khitan and Muslim officials and gave high positions to her own allies. She built palaces, cathedrals, and social structures on an imperial scale, supporting religion and education. She was able to win over most Mongol aristocrats to support Ögedei's son Güyük. But Batu, ruler of the Golden Horde, refused to come to the kurultai, claiming that he was ill and that the climate was too harsh for him. The resulting stalemate lasted more than four years and further destabilized the unity of the empire.

When Genghis Khan's youngest brother Temüge threatened to seize the throne, Güyük came to Karakorum to try to secure his position. Batu eventually agreed to send his brothers and generals to the kurultai convened by Töregene in 1246. Güyük by this time was ill and alcoholic, but his campaigns in Manchuria and Europe gave him the kind of stature necessary for a great khan. He was duly elected at a ceremony attended by Mongols and foreign dignitaries from both within and without the empire — leaders of vassal nations, representatives from Rome, and other entities who came to the kurultai to show their respects and conduct diplomacy.

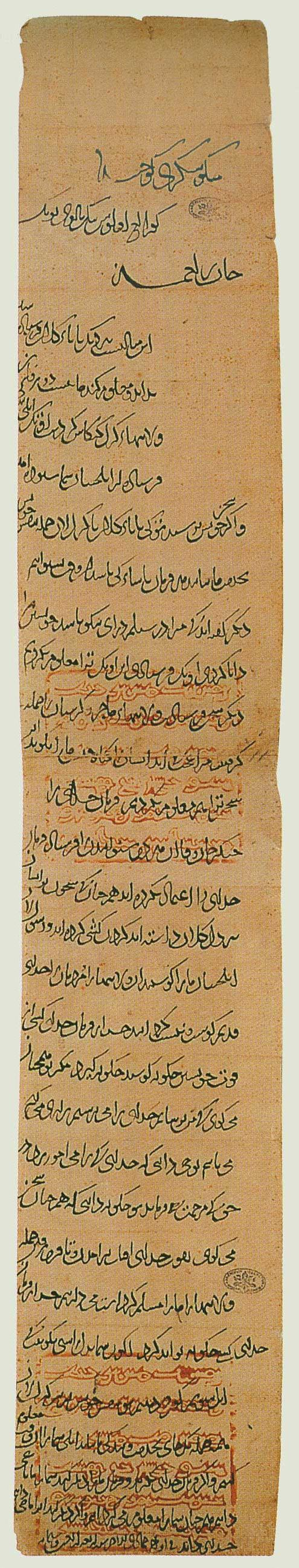
Güyük Khan demanding Pope Innocent IV's submission. The 1246 letter was written in Persian.

Güyük took steps to reduce corruption, announcing that he would continue the policies of his father Ögedei, not those of Töregene. He punished Töregene's supporters, except for governor Arghun the Elder. He also replaced young Qara Hülëgü, the khan of the Chagatai Khanate, with his favorite cousin Yesü Möngke, to assert his newly conferred powers. He restored his father's officials to their former positions and was surrounded by Uyghur, Naiman and Central Asian officials, favoring Han Chinese commanders who had helped his father conquer Northern China. He continued military operations in Korea, advanced into Song China in the south, and into Iraq in the west, and ordered an empire-wide census. Güyük also divided the Sultanate of Rum between Izz-ad-Din Kaykawus and Rukn ad-Din Kilij Arslan, though Kaykawus disagreed with this decision.

Not all parts of the empire respected Güyük's election. The Hashshashins, former Mongol allies whose Grand Master Hasan Jalalud-Din had offered his submission to Genghis Khan in 1221, angered Güyük by refusing to submit. Instead he murdered the Mongol generals in Persia. Güyük appointed his best friend's father Eljigidei as chief commander of the troops in Persia and gave them the task of both reducing the strongholds of the Nizari Ismailis and conquering the Abbasids at the center of the Islamic world, Iran and Iraq.

==== Death of Güyük (1248) ====
In 1248, Güyük raised more troops and suddenly marched westward from the Mongol capital of Karakorum. The reasoning was unclear. Some sources wrote that he sought to recuperate at his personal estate, Emyl; others suggested that he might have been moving to join Eljigidei to conduct a full-scale conquest of the Middle East, or possibly to make a surprise attack on his rival cousin Batu Khan in Kievan Rus.

Suspicious of Güyük's motives, Sorghaghtani Beki, the widow of Genghis's son Tolui, secretly warned her nephew Batu of Güyük's approach. Batu had himself been traveling eastward at the time, possibly to pay homage, or perhaps with other plans in mind. Before the forces of Batu and Güyük met, Güyük, sick and worn out by travel, died en route at Qum-Senggir (Hong-siang-yi-eulh) in Xinjiang, possibly a victim of poison.

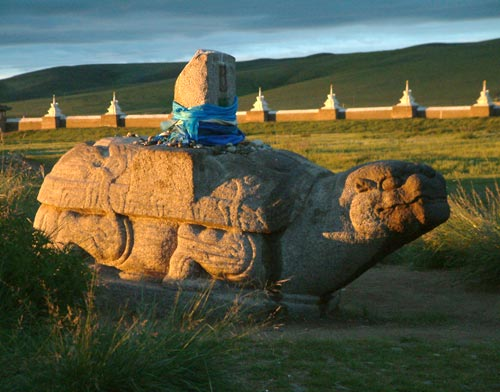
A stone turtle at the site of the Mongol capital, Karakorum

Güyük's widow Oghul Qaimish stepped forward to take control of the empire, but she lacked the skills of her mother-in-law Töregene, and her young sons Khoja and Naku and other princes challenged her authority. To decide on a new great khan, Batu called a kurultai on his own territory in 1250. As it was far from the Mongol heartland, members of the Ögedeid and Chagataid families refused to attend. The kurultai offered the throne to Batu, but he rejected it, claiming he had no interest in the position. Batu instead nominated Möngke, a grandson of Genghis from his son Tolui's lineage. Möngke was leading a Mongol army in Rus, the northern Caucasus and Hungary. The pro-Tolui faction supported Batu's choice, and Möngke was elected; though given the kurultai's limited attendance and location, it was of questionable validity.

Batu sent Möngke, under the protection of his brothers, Berke and Tukhtemur, and his son Sartaq to assemble a more formal kurultai at Kodoe Aral in the heartland. The supporters of Möngke repeatedly invited Oghul Qaimish and the other major Ögedeid and Chagataid princes to attend the kurultai, but they refused each time. The Ögedeid and Chagataid princes refused to accept a descendant of Genghis's son Tolui as leader, demanding that only descendants of Genghis's son Ögedei could be great khan.

=== Rule of Möngke Khan (1251–1259) ===
When Möngke's mother Sorghaghtani and their cousin Berke organized a second kurultai on 1 July 1251, the assembled throng proclaimed Möngke great khan of the Mongol Empire. This marked a major shift in the leadership of the empire, transferring power from the descendants of Genghis's son Ögedei to the descendants of Genghis's son Tolui. The decision was acknowledged by a few of the Ögedeid and Chagataid princes, such as Möngke's cousin Kadan and the deposed khan Qara Hülëgü, but one of the other legitimate heirs, Ögedei's grandson Shiremun, sought to topple Möngke.

Shiremun moved with his own forces toward the emperor's nomadic palace with a plan for an armed attack, but Möngke was alerted by his falconer of the plan. Möngke ordered an investigation of the plot, which led to a series of major trials all across the empire. Many members of the Mongol elite were found guilty and put to death, with estimates ranging from 77 to 300, though princes of Genghis's royal line were often exiled rather than executed.

Möngke confiscated the estates of the Ögedeid and the Chagatai families and shared the western part of the empire with his ally Batu Khan. After the bloody purge, Möngke ordered a general amnesty for prisoners and captives, but thereafter the power of the great khan's throne remained firmly with the descendants of Tolui.

==== Administrative reforms ====
Möngke was a serious man who followed the laws of his ancestors and avoided alcoholism. He was tolerant of outside religions and artistic styles, leading to the building of foreign merchants' quarters, Buddhist monasteries, mosques, and Christian churches in the Mongol capital. As construction projects continued, Karakorum was adorned with Chinese, European, and Persian architecture. One famous example was a large silver tree with cleverly designed pipes that dispensed various drinks. The tree, topped by a triumphant angel, was crafted by Guillaume Boucher, a Parisian goldsmith.

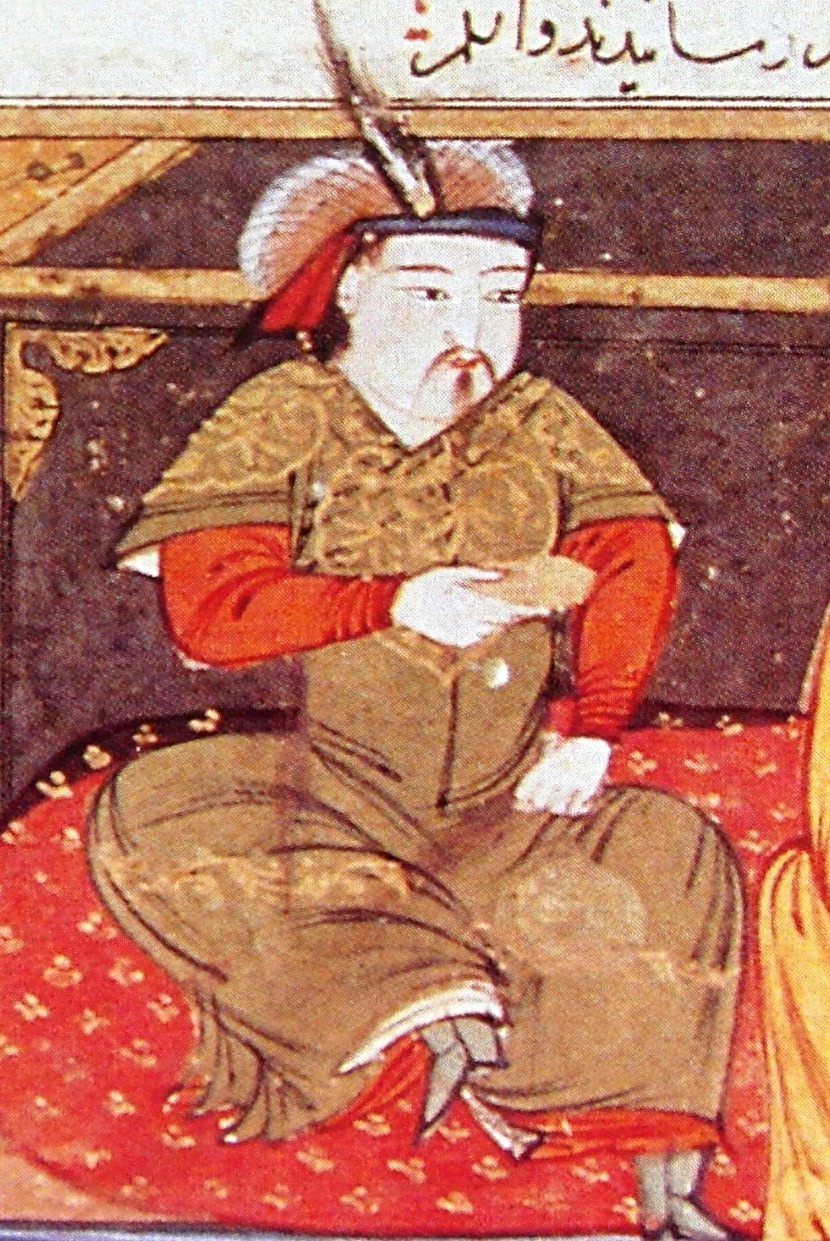
Hulagu, Genghis Khan's grandson and founder of the Il-Khanate. From a medieval Persian manuscript.

Although he had a strong Chinese contingent, Möngke relied heavily on Muslim and Mongol administrators and launched a series of economic reforms to make government expenses more predictable. His court limited government spending and prohibited nobles and troops from abusing civilians or issuing edicts without authorization. He commuted the contribution system to a fixed poll tax which was collected by imperial agents and forwarded to units in need. His court also tried to lighten the tax burden on commoners by reducing tax rates. He also centralized control of monetary affairs and reinforced the guards at the postal relays. Möngke ordered an empire-wide census in 1252 that took several years to complete and was not finished until Novgorod in the far northwest was counted in 1258.

In another move to consolidate his power, Möngke assigned his brothers Hulagu and Kublai to rule Persia and Mongol-held China respectively. In the southern part of the empire he continued his predecessors' struggle against the Song dynasty. In order to outflank the Song from three directions, Möngke dispatched Mongol armies under his brother Kublai to Yunnan, and under his uncle Iyeku to subdue Korea and pressure the Song from that direction as well.

Kublai conquered the Dali Kingdom in 1253 after the Dali King Duan Xingzhi defected to the Mongols and helped them conquer the rest of Yunnan. Möngke's general Qoridai stabilized his control over Tibet, inducing leading monasteries to submit to Mongol rule. Subutai's son Uryankhadai reduced the neighboring peoples of Yunnan to submission and went to war with the kingdom of Đại Việt under the Trần dynasty in northern Vietnam in 1258, but they had to draw back. The Mongol Empire tried to invade Đại Việt again in 1285 and 1287 but were defeated both times.

==== New invasions of the Middle East and Southern China ====
After stabilizing the empire's finances, Möngke once again sought to expand its borders. At kurultais in Karakorum in 1253 and 1258 he approved new invasions of the Middle East and south China. Möngke put Hulagu in overall charge of military and civil affairs in Persia, and appointed Chagataids and Jochids to join Hulagu's army.

The siege of Baghdad

The Muslims from Qazvin denounced the menace of the Nizari Ismailis, a well-known sect of Shiites. The Mongol Naiman commander Kitbuqa began to assault several Ismaili fortresses in 1253, before Hulagu advanced in 1256. Ismaili Grand Master Rukn al-Din Khurshah surrendered in 1257 and was executed. All of the Ismaili strongholds in Persia were destroyed by Hulagu's army in 1257, except for Girdkuh which held out until 1271.

The center of the Islamic Empire at the time was Baghdad, which had held power for 500 years but was suffering internal divisions. When its caliph al-Mustasim refused to submit to the Mongols, Baghdad was besieged and captured by the Mongols in 1258 and subjected to a merciless sack, an event considered one of the most catastrophic events in the history of Islam, and sometimes compared to the rupture of the Kaaba. With the destruction of the Abbasid Caliphate, Hulagu had an open route to Syria and moved against the other Muslim powers in the region.

His army advanced toward Ayyubid-ruled Syria, capturing small local states en route. The sultan Al-Nasir Yusuf of the Ayyubids refused to show himself before Hulagu; however, he had accepted Mongol supremacy two decades earlier. When Hulagu headed further west, the Armenians from Cilicia, the Seljuks from Rum and the Christian realms of Antioch and Tripoli submitted to Mongol authority, joining them in their assault against the Muslims. While some cities surrendered without resisting, others, such as Mayafarriqin fought back; their populations were massacred and the cities were sacked.

==== Death of Möngke Khan (1259) ====
Meanwhile, in the northwestern portion of the empire, Batu's successor and younger brother Berke sent punitive expeditions to Ukraine, Belarus, Lithuania, and Poland. Dissension began brewing between the northwestern and southwestern sections of the Mongol Empire as Batu suspected that Hulagu's invasion of Western Asia would result in the elimination of Batu's own dominance there.

In the southern part of the empire, Möngke Khan himself led his army, but did not complete the conquest of China. Military operations were generally successful, but prolonged, so the forces did not withdraw to the north as was customary when the weather turned hot. Disease ravaged the Mongol forces with bloody epidemics, and Möngke died there on 11 August 1259. This event began a new chapter in the history of the Mongols, as again a decision needed to be made on a new great khan. Mongol armies across the empire withdrew from their campaigns to convene a new kurultai.

== Division of the empire ==
=== Dispute over succession ===
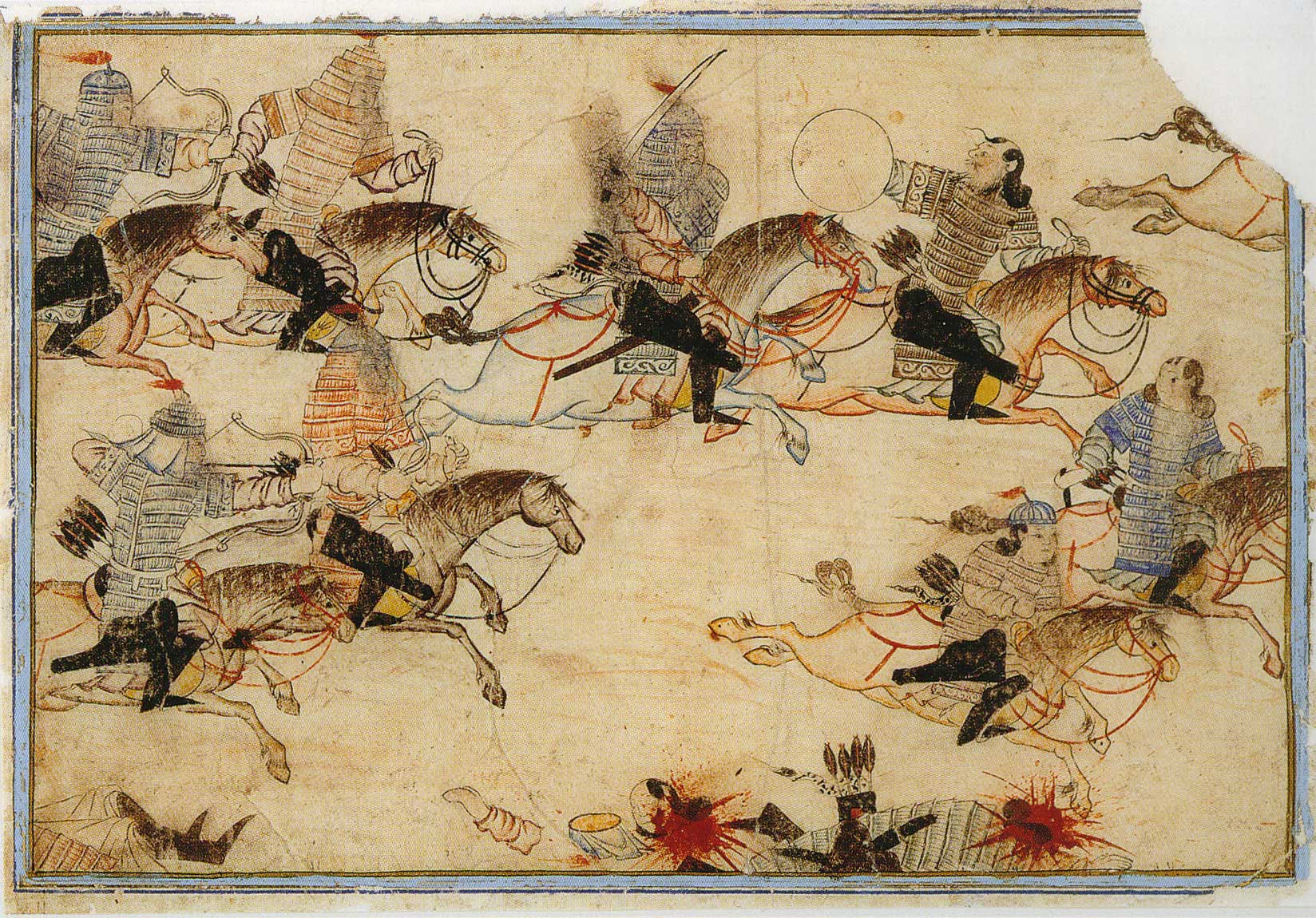
The Mongols at war

Möngke's brother Hulagu broke off his successful military advance into Syria, withdrawing the bulk of his forces to Mughan and leaving only a small contingent under his general Kitbuqa. The opposing forces in the region, the Christian Crusaders and Muslim Mamluks, both recognizing that the Mongols were the greater threat, took advantage of the weakened state of the Mongol army and engaged in an unusual passive truce with each other.

In 1260, the Mamluks advanced from Egypt, being allowed to camp and resupply near the Christian stronghold of Acre, and engaged Kitbuqa's forces just north of Galilee at the Battle of Ain Jalut. The Mongols were defeated, and Kitbuqa executed. This pivotal battle marked the western limit for Mongol expansion in the Middle East, and the Mongols were never again able to make serious military advances farther than Syria.

In a separate part of the empire, Kublai Khan, another brother of Hulagu and Möngke, heard of the great khan's death at the Huai River in China. Rather than returning to the capital, he continued his advance into the Wuchang area of China, near the Yangtze River. Their younger brother Ariq Böke took advantage of the absence of Hulagu and Kublai, and used his position at the capital to win the title of great khan for himself, with representatives of all the family branches proclaiming him as the leader at the kurultai in Karakorum. When Kublai learned of this, he summoned his own kurultai at Kaiping, and nearly all the senior princes and great noyans in North China and Manchuria supported his own candidacy over that of Ariq Böke.

=== Mongol Civil War ===
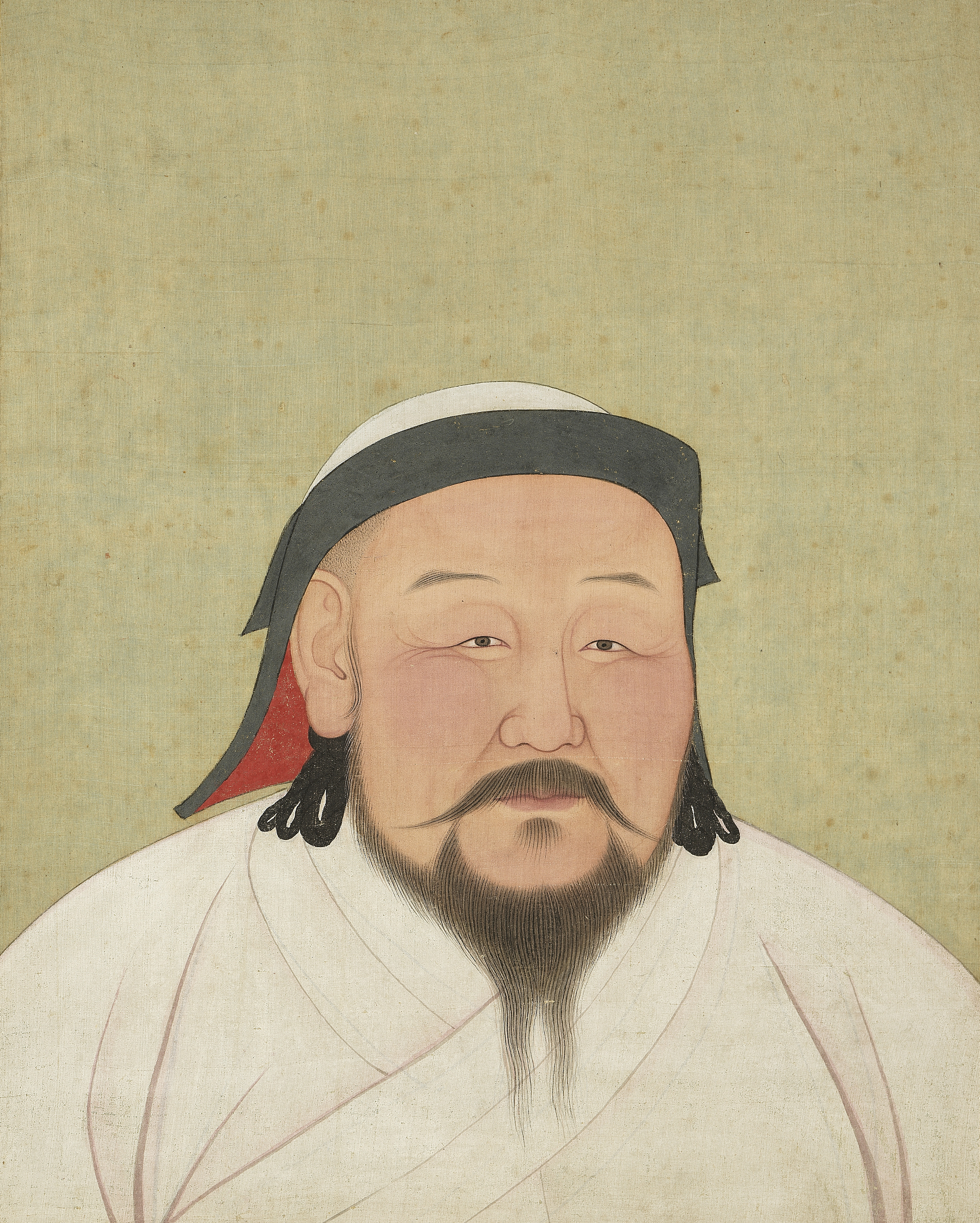
Kublai Khan, Genghis Khan's grandson and founder of the Yuan dynasty

Battles ensued between the armies of Kublai and those of his brother Ariq Böke, which included forces still loyal to Möngke's previous administration. Kublai's army easily eliminated Ariq Böke's supporters and seized control of the civil administration in southern Mongolia. Further challenges took place from their cousins, the Chagataids. Kublai sent Abishka, a Chagataid prince loyal to him, to take charge of Chagatai's realm. But Ariq Böke captured and then executed Abishka, having his own man Alghu crowned there instead. Kublai's new administration blockaded Ariq Böke in Mongolia to cut off food supplies, causing a famine. Karakorum fell quickly to Kublai, but Ariq Böke rallied and re-took the capital in 1261.

In southwestern Ilkhanate, Hulagu was loyal to his brother Kublai, but clashes with their cousin Berke, a Muslim and the ruler of the Golden Horde, began in 1262. The suspicious deaths of Jochid princes in Hulagu's service, unequal distribution of war booty, and Hulagu's massacres of Muslims increased the anger of Berke, who considered supporting a rebellion of the Georgian Kingdom against Hulagu's rule in 1259–1260. Berke also forged an alliance with the Egyptian Mamluks against Hulagu and supported Kublai's rival claimant, Ariq Böke.

Hulagu died on 8 February 1264. Berke sought to take advantage and invade Hulagu's realm, but he died along the way, and a few months later Alghu Khan of the Chagatai Khanate died as well. Kublai named Hulagu's son Abaqa as new Ilkhan, and nominated Batu's grandson Möngke Temür to lead the Golden Horde. Abaqa sought foreign alliances, such as attempting to form a Franco-Mongol alliance against the Egyptian Mamluks. Ariq Böke surrendered to Kublai at Shangdu on 21 August 1264.

=== Campaigns of Kublai Khan (1264–1294) ===
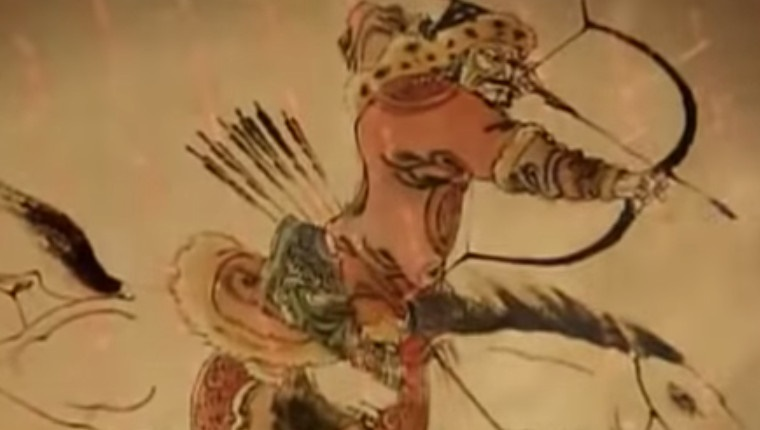
Mongol warrior on horseback, preparing a mounted archery shot

In the south, after the fall of Xiangyang in 1273, the Mongols sought the final conquest of the Song dynasty in South China. In 1271, Kublai renamed the new Mongol regime in China as the Yuan dynasty and sought to sinicize his image as Emperor of China to win the control of the Chinese people. Kublai moved his headquarters to Khanbaliq, the genesis for what later became the modern city of Beijing. His establishment of a capital there was a controversial move to many Mongols who accused him of being too closely tied to Chinese culture.

The Mongols were eventually successful in their campaigns against (Song) China, and the Chinese Song imperial family surrendered to the Yuan in 1276, making the Mongols the first non-Chinese people to conquer all of China. Kublai used his base to build a powerful empire, creating an academy, offices, trade ports, and canals, and sponsoring arts and science. Mongol records list 20,166 public schools created during his reign.

After achieving actual or nominal dominion over much of Eurasia and successfully conquering China, Kublai pursued further expansion. His invasions of Burma and Sakhalin were costly, and his attempted invasions of Đại Việt (northern Vietnam) and Champa (southern Vietnam) ended in devastating defeat, but secured vassal statuses of those countries. The Mongol armies were repeatedly beaten in Đại Việt and were crushed at the Battle of Bạch Đằng.

Nogai and Konchi, the khan of the White Horde, established friendly relations with the Yuan dynasty and the Ilkhanate. Political disagreement among contending branches of the family over the office of great khan continued, but the economic and commercial success of the Mongol Empire continued despite the squabbling.

In 1274 and again in 1281, Kublai Khan invaded Japan on two separate occasions. However, he was not able to conquer Japan. In the period of the Mongol invasion, the Battles of Bun'ei and Kōan were fought along the coast of Hakata Bay near modern-day Fukuoka.

== Competing entities ==
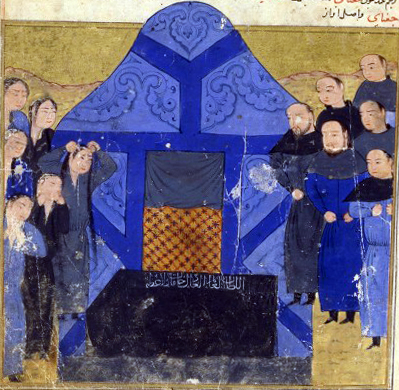
The funeral of Chagatai Khan

Major changes occurred in the Mongol Empire in the late 1200s. Kublai Khan, after having conquered all of China and established the Yuan dynasty, died in 1294. He was succeeded by his grandson Temür Khan, who continued Kublai's policies. At the same time the Toluid Civil War, along with the Berke–Hulegu war and the subsequent Kaidu–Kublai war, greatly weakened the authority of the great khan over the entirety of the Mongol Empire and the empire fractured into autonomous khanates, the Yuan dynasty and the three western khanates: the Golden Horde, the Chagatai Khanate and the Ilkhanate. Only the Ilkhanate remained loyal to the Yuan court but endured its own power struggle, in part because of a dispute with the growing Islamic factions within the southwestern part of the empire.

After the death of Kaidu, the Chatagai ruler Duwa initiated a peace proposal and persuaded the Ögedeids to submit to Temür Khan. In 1304, all of the khanates approved a peace treaty and accepted Yuan emperor Temür's supremacy. This established the nominal supremacy of the Yuan dynasty over the western khanates, which was to last for several decades. This supremacy was based on weaker foundations than that of the earlier Khagans and each of the four khanates continued to develop separately and function as independent states.

Nearly a century of conquest and civil war was followed by relative stability, the Pax Mongolica, and international trade and cultural exchanges flourished between Asia and Europe. Communication between the Yuan dynasty in China and the Ilkhanate in Persia further encouraged trade and commerce between east and west. Patterns of Yuan royal textiles could be found on the opposite side of the empire adorning Armenian decorations; trees and vegetables were transplanted across the empire; and technological innovations spread from Mongol dominions toward the West. Pope John XXII was presented a memorandum from the eastern church describing the Pax Mongolica: "... Khagan is one of the greatest monarchs and all lords of the state, e.g., the king of Almaligh (Chagatai Khanate), emperor Abu Said and Uzbek Khan, are his subjects, saluting his holiness to pay their respects." However, while the four khanates continued to interact with one another well into the 14th century, they did so as sovereign states and never again pooled their resources in a cooperative military endeavor.

=== Development of the khanates ===
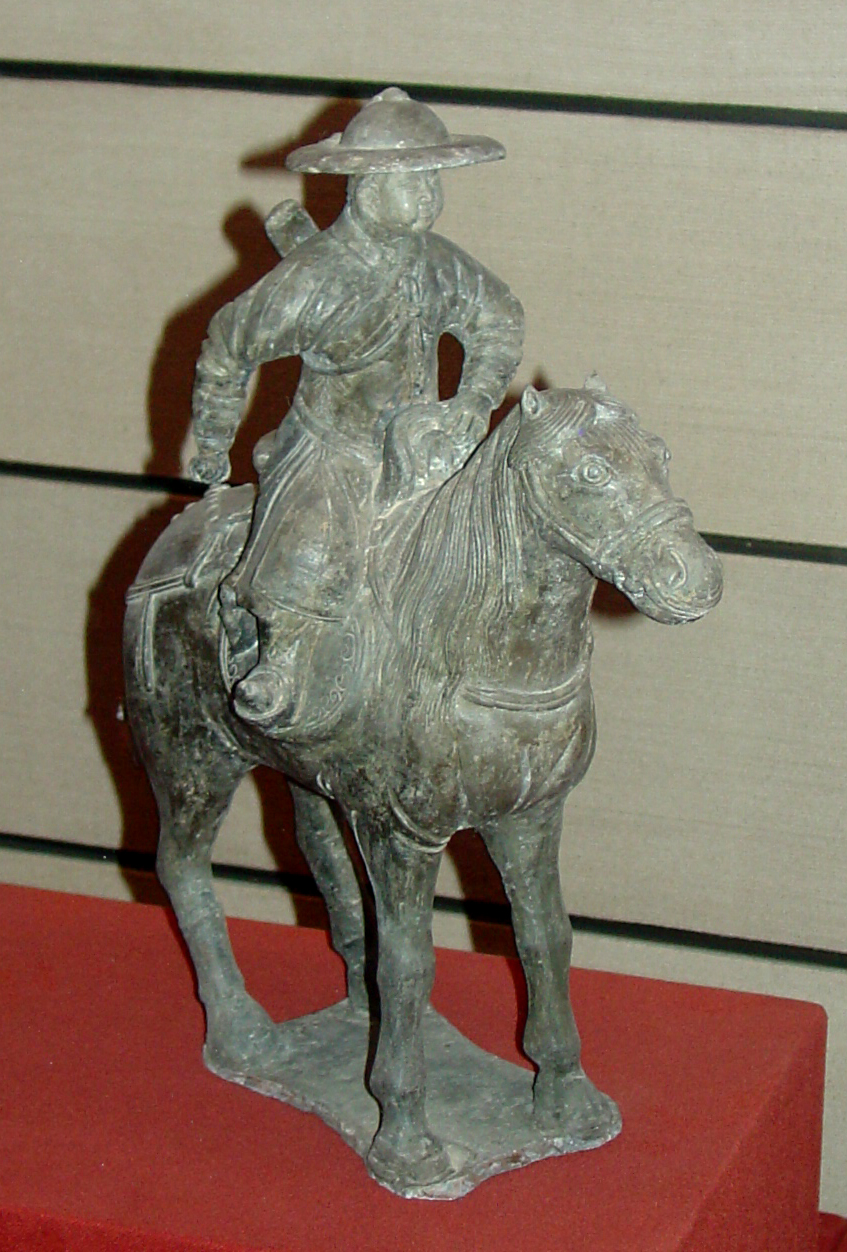
Mongol rider, Yuan dynasty

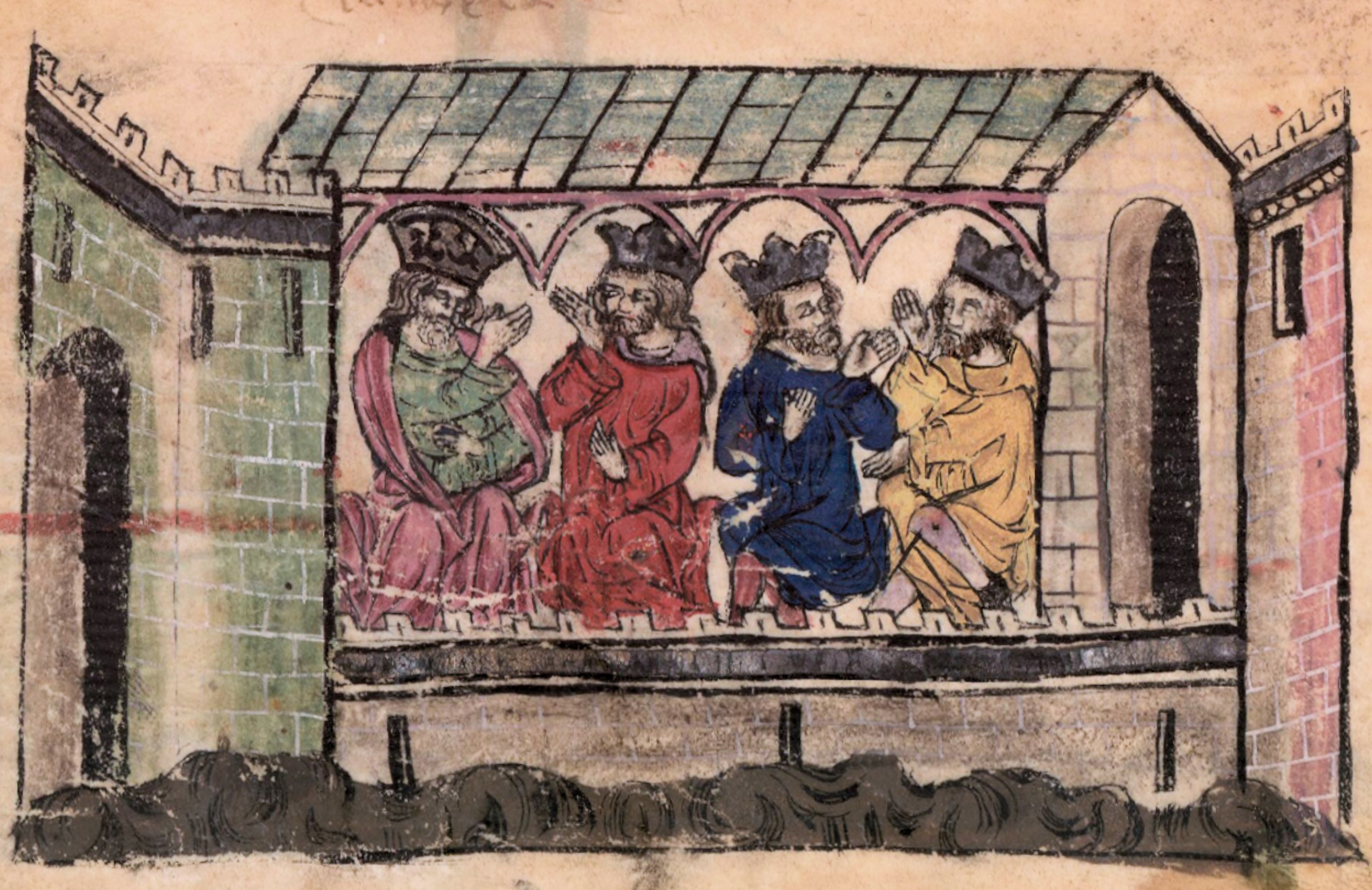
A European depiction of the four khans, Temür (Yuan), Chapar (House of Ögedei), Toqta (Golden Horde), and Öljaitü (Ilkhanate), in the Fleur des histoires d'orient

In spite of his conflicts with Kaidu and Duwa, Yuan emperor Temür established a tributary relationship with the war-like Shan people after his series of military operations against Thailand from 1297 to 1303. This was to mark the end of the southern expansion of the Mongols.

When Ghazan took the throne of the Ilkhanate in 1295, he formally accepted Islam as his own religion, marking a turning point in Mongol history after which Mongol Persia became more and more Islamic. Despite this, Ghazan continued to strengthen ties with Temür Khan and the Yuan dynasty in the east. It was politically useful to advertise the great khan's authority in the Ilkhanate, because the Golden Horde in Rus had long made claims on nearby Georgia. Within four years, Ghazan began sending tribute to the Yuan court and appealing to other khans to accept Temür Khan as their overlord. He oversaw an extensive program of cultural and scientific interaction between the Ilkhanate and the Yuan dynasty in the following decades.

Ghazan's faith may have been Islamic, but he continued his ancestors' war with the Egyptian Mamluks, and consulted with his old Mongol advisers in his native tongue. He defeated the Mamluk army at the Battle of Wadi al-Khazandar in 1299, but he was only briefly able to occupy Syria, due to distracting raids from the Chagatai Khanate under its de facto ruler Kaidu, who was at war with the Ilkhans and Yuan dynasty.

Struggling for influence within the Golden Horde, Kaidu sponsored his own candidate Kobeleg against Bayan (r. 1299–1304), the khan of the White Horde. Bayan, after receiving military support from the Mongols in Rus, requested assistance from both Temür Khan and the Ilkhanate to organize a unified attack against Kaidu's forces. Temür was amenable and attacked Kaidu a year later. After a bloody battle with Temür's armies near the Zawkhan River in 1301, Kaidu died and was succeeded by Duwa.

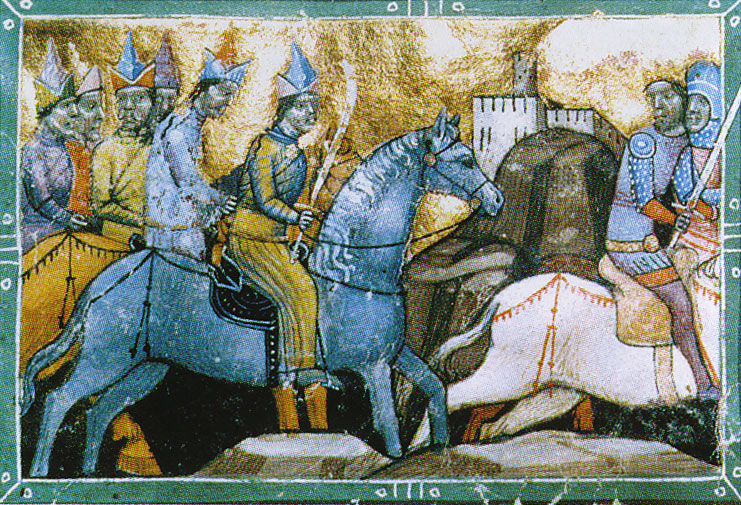
Hungarian king Béla IV in flight from the Mongols under general Kadan of the Golden Horde

Duwa was challenged by Kaidu's son Chapar, but with the assistance of Temür, Duwa defeated the Ögedeids. Tokhta of the Golden Horde, also seeking a general peace, sent 20,000 men to buttress the Yuan frontier. Tokhta died in 1312, though, and was succeeded by Ozbeg (r. 1313–1341), who seized the throne of the Golden Horde and persecuted non-Muslim Mongols. The Yuan's influence on the Horde was largely reversed and border clashes between Mongol states resumed. Ayurbarwada Buyantu Khan's envoys backed Tokhta's son against Ozbeg.

In the Chagatai Khanate, Esen Buqa I (r. 1309–1318) was enthroned as khan after suppressing a sudden rebellion by Ögedei's descendants and driving Chapar into exile. The Yuan and Ilkhanid armies eventually attacked the Chagatai Khanate. Recognising the potential economic benefits and the Genghisid legacy, Ozbeg reopened friendly relations with the Yuan in 1326. He strengthened ties with the Muslim world as well, building mosques and other elaborate structures such as baths. By the second decade of the 14th century, Mongol invasions had further decreased. In 1323, Abu Said Khan (r. 1316–1335) of the Ilkhanate signed a peace treaty with Egypt. At his request, the Yuan court awarded his custodian Chupan the title of commander-in-chief of all Mongol khanates, but Chupan died in late 1327.

Civil war erupted in the Yuan dynasty in 1328–29. After the death of Yesün Temür in 1328, Tugh Temür became the new leader in Khanbaliq, while Yesün Temür's son Ragibagh succeeded to the throne in Shangdu, leading to the civil war known as the War of the Two Capitals. Tugh Temür defeated Ragibagh, but the Chagatai khan Eljigidey (r. 1326–1329) supported Kusala, elder brother of Tugh Temür, as great khan. He invaded with a commanding force, and Tugh Temür abdicated. Kusala was elected khan on 30 August 1329. Kusala was then poisoned by a Kypchak commander under Tugh Temür, who returned to power.

The successor states of the Mongol Empire in 1335: the Ilkhanate, Golden Horde, Yuan dynasty, and Chagatai Khanate

Tugh Temür (1304–1332) was knowledgeable about Chinese language and history and was also a creditable poet, calligrapher, and painter. In order to be accepted by other khanates as the sovereign of the Mongol world, he sent Genghisid princes and descendants of notable Mongol generals to the Chagatai Khanate, Ilkhan Abu Said, and Ozbeg. In response to the emissaries, they all agreed to send tribute each year. Furthermore, Tugh Temür gave lavish presents and an imperial seal to Eljigidey to mollify his anger.

=== Rump states of the Mongol Empire ===
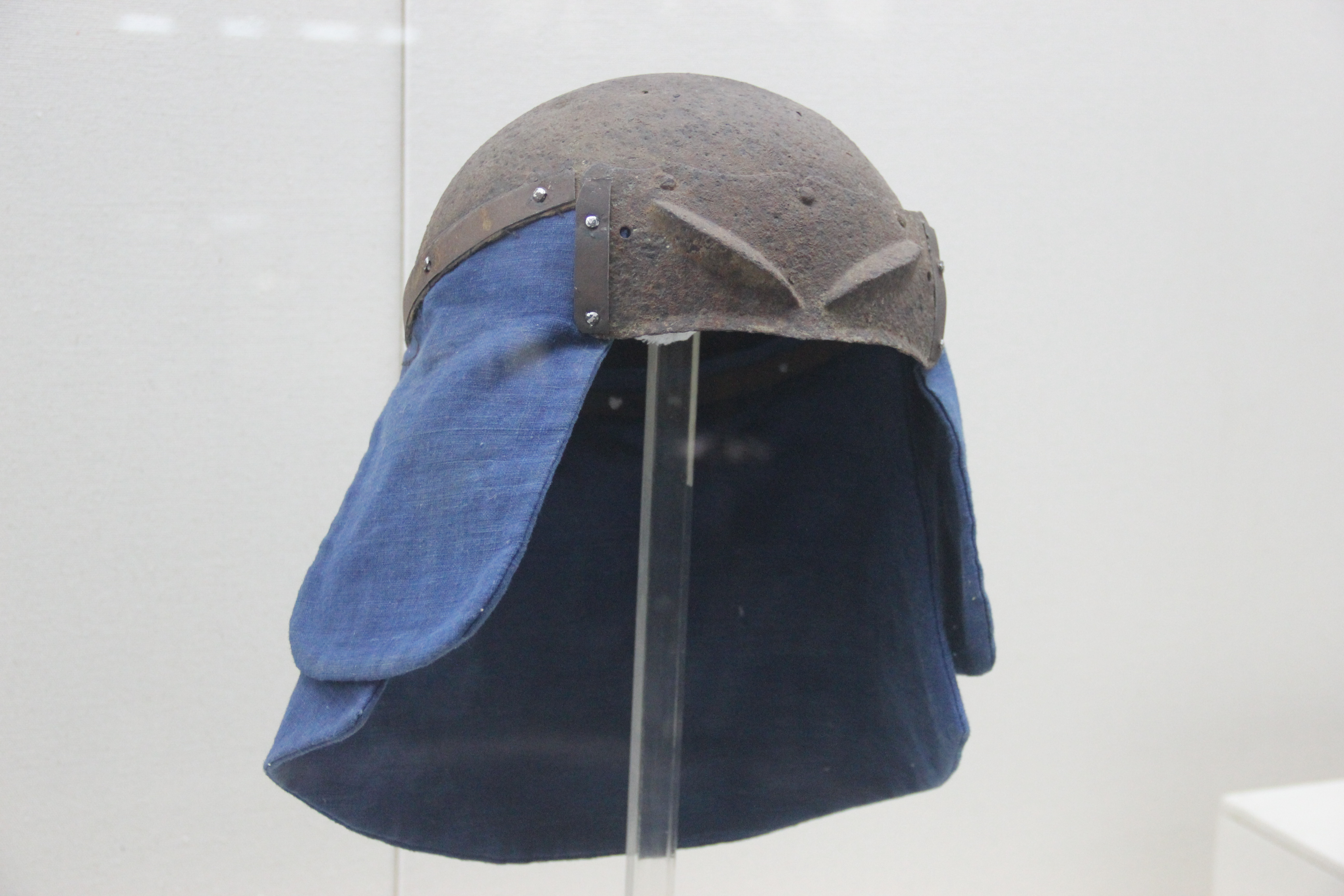
Iron helmet, Mongol Empire

With the death of Ilkhan Abu Said Bahatur in 1335, Mongol rule faltered and Persia fell into political anarchy. A year later his successor was killed by an Oirat governor, and the Ilkhanate was divided between the Suldus, the Jalayir, Qasarid Togha Temür (d. 1353), and Persian warlords. Taking advantage of the chaos, the Georgians pushed the Mongols out of their territory, and the Uyghur commander Eretna established an independent state (Eretnids) in Anatolia in 1336. Following the downfall of their Mongol masters, the loyal vassal, the Armenian Kingdom of Cilicia, received escalating threats from the Mamluks and were eventually overrun in 1375. Along with the dissolution of the Ilkhanate in Persia, Mongol rulers in China and the Chagatai Khanate were also in turmoil. The plague known as the Black Death, which started in the Mongol dominions and spread to Europe, added to the confusion. Disease devastated all the khanates, cutting off commercial ties and killing millions. The plague may have taken 50 million lives in Europe alone in the 14th century.

As the power of the Mongols declined, chaos erupted throughout the empire as non-Mongol leaders expanded their own influence. The Golden Horde lost all of its western dominions (including modern Belarus and Ukraine) to Poland and Lithuania between 1342 and 1369. Muslim and non-Muslim princes in the Chagatai Khanate warred with each other from 1331 to 1343, and the Chagatai Khanate disintegrated when non-Genghisid warlords set up their own puppet khans in Transoxiana and Moghulistan. Janibeg Khan (r. 1342–1357) briefly reasserted Jochid dominance over the Chaghataids. Demanding submission from an offshoot of the Ilkhanate in Azerbaijan, he boasted that "today three uluses are under my control".

However, rival families of the Jochids began fighting for the throne of the Golden Horde (Great Troubles, 1359–1381) after the assassination of his successor Berdibek Khan in 1359. The last Yuan ruler Toghan Temür (r. 1333–1370) was powerless to regulate those troubles, a sign that the empire had nearly reached its end. His court's unbacked currency had entered a hyperinflationary spiral and the Han-Chinese people revolted due to the Yuan's harsh impositions. In the 1350s, Gongmin of Goryeo successfully pushed Mongol garrisons back and exterminated the family of Toghan Temür Khan's empress while Tai Situ Changchub Gyaltsen managed to eliminate the Mongol influence in Tibet.

Increasingly isolated from their subjects, the Mongols quickly lost most of China to the rebellious Ming forces and in 1368 fled to their heartland in Mongolia. After the overthrow of the Yuan dynasty the Golden Horde lost touch with Mongolia and China, while the two main parts of the Chagatai Khanate were defeated by Timur (Tamerlane) (1336–1405), who founded the Timurid Empire. However, remnants of the Chagatai Khanate survived; the last Chagataid state to survive was the Yarkent Khanate, until its defeat by the Oirat Dzungar Khanate in the Dzungar conquest of Altishahr in 1680. The Golden Horde broke into smaller Turkic-hordes that declined steadily in power over four centuries. Among them, the khanate's shadow, the Great Horde, survived until 1502, when one of its successors, the Crimean Khanate, sacked Sarai. The Crimean Khanate lasted until 1783, whereas khanates such as the Khanate of Bukhara and the Kazakh Khanate lasted even longer.

== Military ==
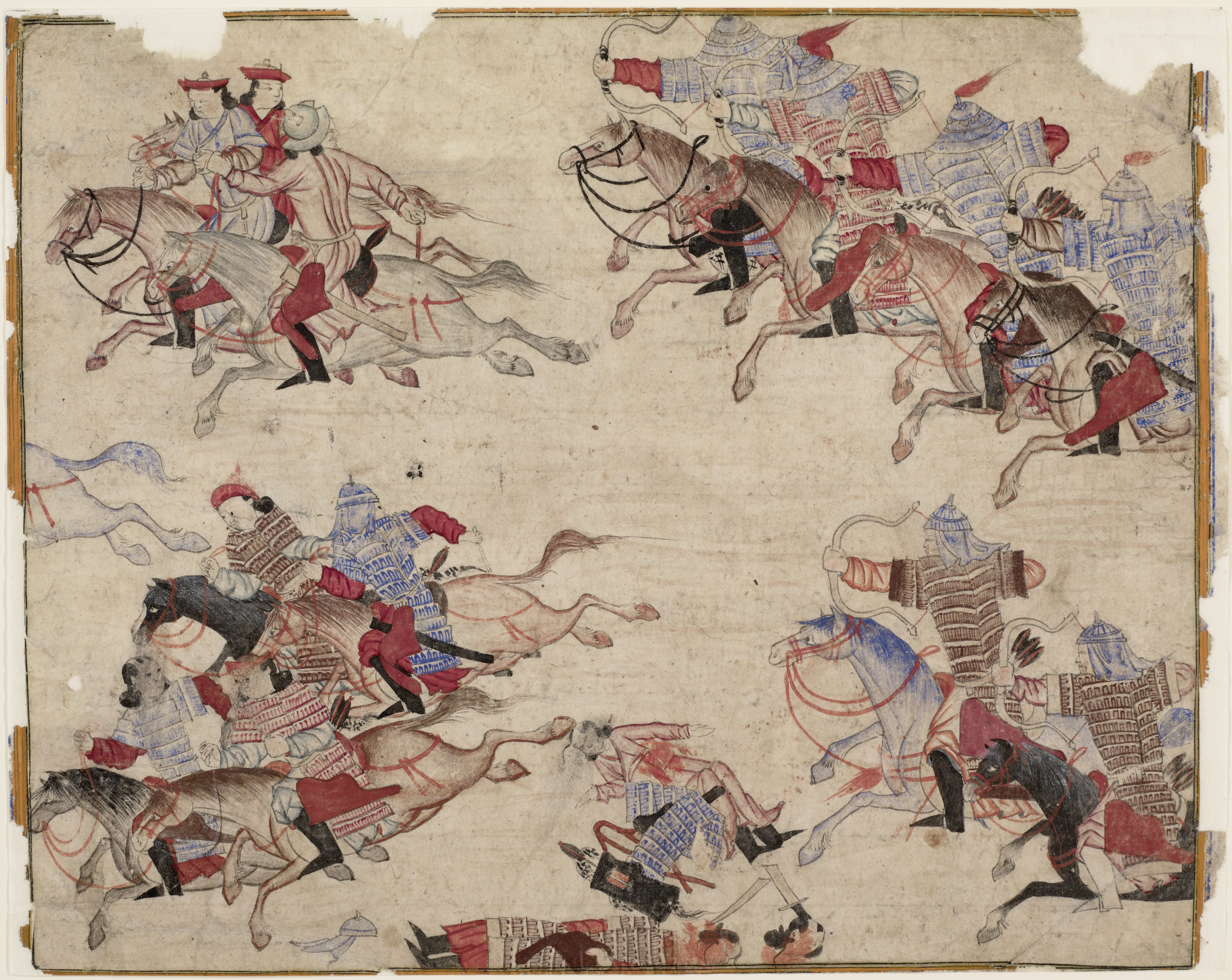
14th-century depiction of Mongol warriors in lamellar armour, on Mongolian ponies and using unique cavalry techniques, pursuing their enemy

The Mongol military eliminated the traditional weaknesses of nomadic armies (Note: Such Eurasian nomads included the Alans, the Huns, the Pannonian Avars, the First and Second Turkic Khaganates, the Khazars, the Uyghur Khaganate, the Oghuz Turks, and the Cumans.) and built upon their tactical strengths to become one of the most formidable armed forces in history. Previous nomadic armies were based on the skill of horse-archers—armoured cavalry able to shoot accurately and quickly with composite bows—who often overwhelmed their enemies with their speed and mobility, ambushes, or feigned retreats. However, their shortcomings included poor siege warfare capabilities, an inability to satisfactorily occupy defeated enemies, and above all a lack of military discipline, which often in resulted in disunity or even, after a defeat, disintegration. The reforms initiated by Genghis Khan allowed the Mongol army to resolve these weaknesses, but their capabilities continued to evolve in response to new threats or opportunities to encompass, according to Christopher Atwood, "a vision of comprehensive warfare unique in the Middle Ages".

=== Focus and aims ===
To Genghis Khan, Atwood believes, "war was a personal vendetta against willfully defiant rulers" who had disrespected him or the Mongols. The broadening of these aims into a goal of world conquest was a gradual one; David Morgan argued that the Mongols "came round to the idea when they found that they were, in fact, conquering the world". The attractiveness of the idea was enhanced by the Mongol army's continuous success. By the time of the rule of Güyük Khan (r. 1246–1248), as he stated to the papal envoy Carpini, it had developed into official ideology.

from the rising of the sun to its setting, all the lands have been made subject to me. Who could do this contrary to the command of God?

=== Soldiers, horses, and equipment ===
Every adult (Note: 15 years old or over.) Mongol man was a soldier; when not called up, they resumed their traditional pastoralist way of life. They received no army pay save plunder, which was divided post-battle according to each soldier's contribution. Most were horse-archers, having learned to ride since childhood. The small Mongolian breed was strong, quiet, and particularly hardy—although usually not shod, one could travel 600 miles (970 km) in nine days. A Mongol soldier took on campaign, on average, five or six horses to ride on alternate days. Ill-treatment of horses, such as eating before tending to their needs, could be punishable by death.

The Mongol composite bow, made of wood and horn, had a normal range of around 325 metres (1,066 ft), but in favourable conditions it could reach 530 metres (1,740 ft). (Note: By comparison, the medieval European crossbow was accurate up to 75 metres (246 ft), while the English longbow had an effective range of 220 metres (720 ft).) Mongol soldiers, who all had at least one bow, carried them alongside two or three quivers containing arrows. Most arrowheads were of usual shape and construction, but the Mongols also used special arrows which whistled, stunned, or pierced. A major drawback of the bow was that it could not be used in the rain or damp weather. The Mongols preferred to not engage in close combat with forces who would usually be superior in that aspect, but nevertheless carried a wide range of hand-to-hand weaponry, including lances, maces, axes, spears, or clubs. The majority of Mongol soldiers had little or no armour, wearing as little as a deel (heavy coat) with an undergarment of dog or goat skin, accompanied by thick felt boots and fur hats. Wealthier Mongols could afford lamellar armour, preferred to metal mail because of its easy manufacture and greater effectiveness against arrows. Conical helmets were usually made of iron. Shields were used by sentries or by dismounted cavalry. Soldiers also had to carry equipment, including their tents.

=== Organisation and preparation ===
To ensure the old tribal loyalties disappeared, Genghis Khan organised his troops using a decimal system, with Mongols originating from different tribes assigned to individual units of tens, hundreds, and thousands. Another critical reform was the institution of strict military discipline across the whole army from general down to common soldier. Officers were responsible for the training and equipping of the men under their command; comrades in units were ordered to protect each other in battle; and individual soldiers were forbidden from fleeing or looting without permission. If any soldier or unit failed in their duties, they were liable to be punished, often with execution. Institutions such as the layout of army camps or the operation chain of command were standardised, and the role of the keshig (imperial guard) was centred to ensure it served as a military academy for future generals.

The cohesion and unity of the Mongol military was a much greater factor in their success than any numerical superiority— the total strength available in Genghis's lifetime was likely between only 50,000 and 75,000 soldiers, and Mongol armies were almost always outnumbered. Before the division of the empire, the army was divided into five formations: the regular army, the alginchin and tamma frontier troops, who served as scouts and nomadic garrisons respectively, the keshig, and the qara'ul/qaraghul, whose function is unclear but may have included guarding roads and the frontier. All soldiers received a distinctive haircut, the uniqueness of which discouraged desertion.

The Mongols were accustomed to rest in late spring and summer. Campaigns, which normally took place in winter, were planned at summer kurultai's. Here, commanders were appointed and plans drawn up, often using military intelligence gathered from merchants or their own scouting networks. Mongol war plans balanced independent tactical thinking by commanders with a strict strategic timetable. This allowed coordinated movements between divisions hundreds of miles apart before they rendezvoused at pre-selected locations. Preparations would begin in autumn, and the campaign usually started in winter—unlike their enemies, the Mongols favoured fighting in cold weather.

=== Strategy and tactics ===
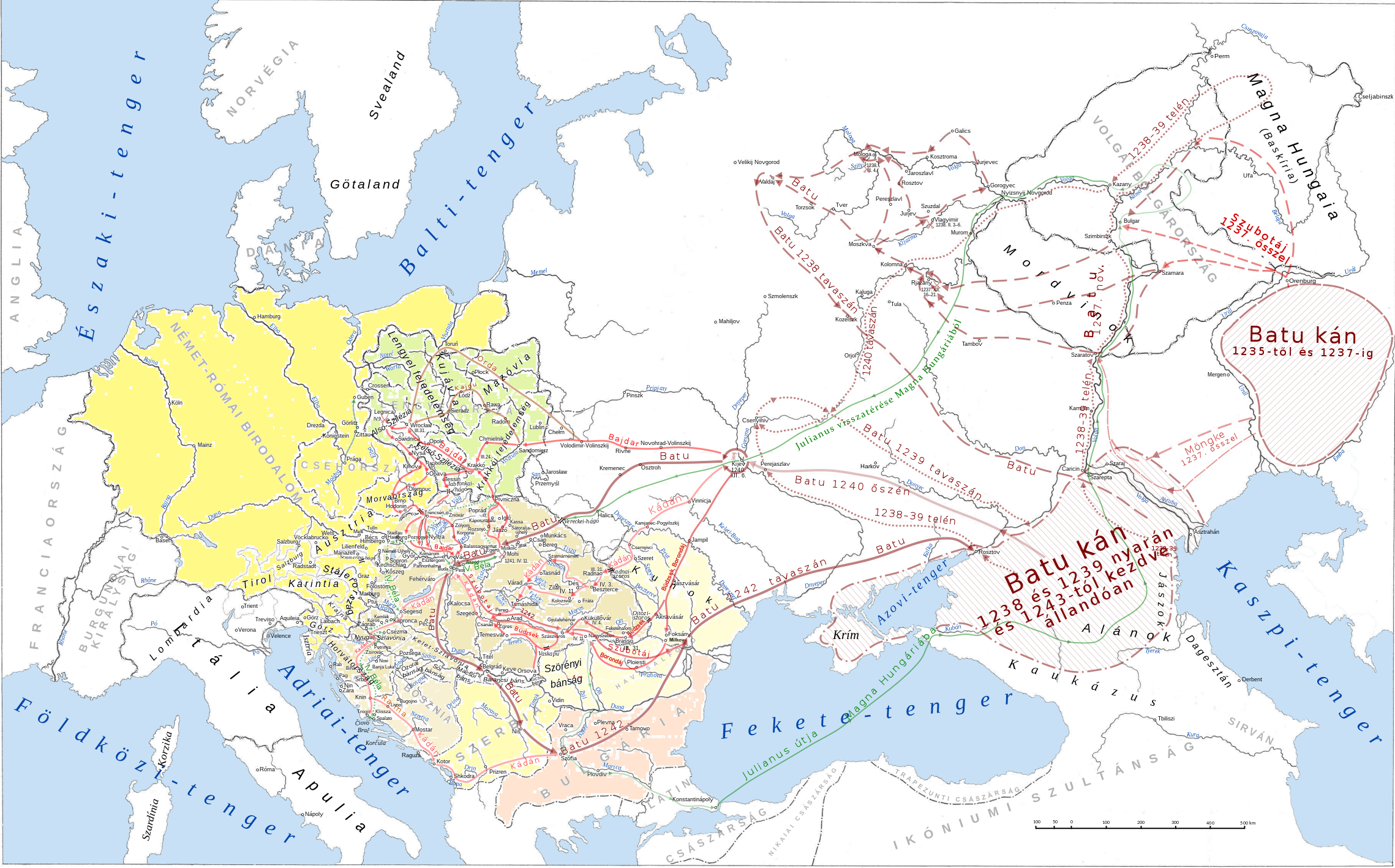
Map of the Mongol invasion of Europe, showing the paths of individual columns dozens of miles apart which coordinated their movements to high levels of strategic precision

The Mongols usually planned a multi-pronged invasion, relying on their plans and scouting networks to allow individual columns to join with others. Moving armies were protected from surprise attacks by scouting screens which ranged tens or hundreds of kilometers around the main force. They preferred to provoke the enemy ruler into an initial battlefield confrontation in which Mongol combat skill would prove decisive, followed by the destruction of smaller strongholds, and then the capture of the enemy capital. This sequence cut off any hierarchical communication, encouraged refugees to flee to the capital, decreasing the inhabitants' morale and supplies, and allowed the Mongols to obtain labour and materials to attack the best-defended fortresses. Often the enemy ruler was intensively pursued to prevent any force rallying around him. Similarly, individual divisions would unpredictably attack individual strongholds before quickly withdrawing, preventing local lords from helping their neighbours. (Note: Timothy May, terming this the Mongols' "Tsunami Strategy", emphasises that it was not a scorched earth policy designed to make the region uninhabitable, but rather one aimed at halting and destroying any remaining military capability.)

Mongol military tactics exploited their mastery as horse archers, emphasised their mobility, flexibility, and organisation, and generally aimed for a decisive total victory. They included traditional steppe tactics such as ambushes or the famous feigned retreat, which often lasted days before the Mongols confronted their tired pursuers on their chosen battlefield. Other tactics included hit-and-run barrages which resembled the later European caracole, specialised formations which disrupted enemy troops, or an "arrow storm" tactic which used the principle of concentrated firepower against a kill zone. Encirclement tactics were practised during the nerge great hunts, during which the Mongols formed circles many kilometres wide which gradually contracted, herding animals towards the center; this itself was sometimes used to extinguish guerilla resistance.

The Mongols were initially poor at siege warfare, only being able to conquer walls with the element of surprise. However, they quickly learnt to incorporate Muslim and Chinese siege engineers into their armies. These artillery experts were used, in addition to sieges, on the battlefield and in logistics. Their equipment included trebuchets, mangonels, exploding shells, flaming naphtha, and the world's earliest-known cannon, dating from the late 13th century; their tactics included sapping, night attacks, and diverted bodies of water. The Mongols heavily used prisoners of war as forced labour and human shields during sieges. Naval warfare was generally only practised by the Yuan dynasty successor state.

Mongol armies also utilised terror tactics, psychological warfare, and propaganda. The population of captured cities, aside from useful individuals such as craftsmen, were usually massacred. The Mongols encouraged news of these events to be exaggerated and spread as widely as possible, to terrify potential targets into surrendering before a costly siege. They exaggerated the size of their armies with rumours, dummies mounted on spare horses, or extra fires lit at night camps; they promoted rebellion in enemy territory; and they sought to pit potential rivals against each other. Several accounts record that Mongol shamans played pivotal roles in summoning rainstorms or snowstorms which hindered enemy forces.

== Society ==
=== Religions ===
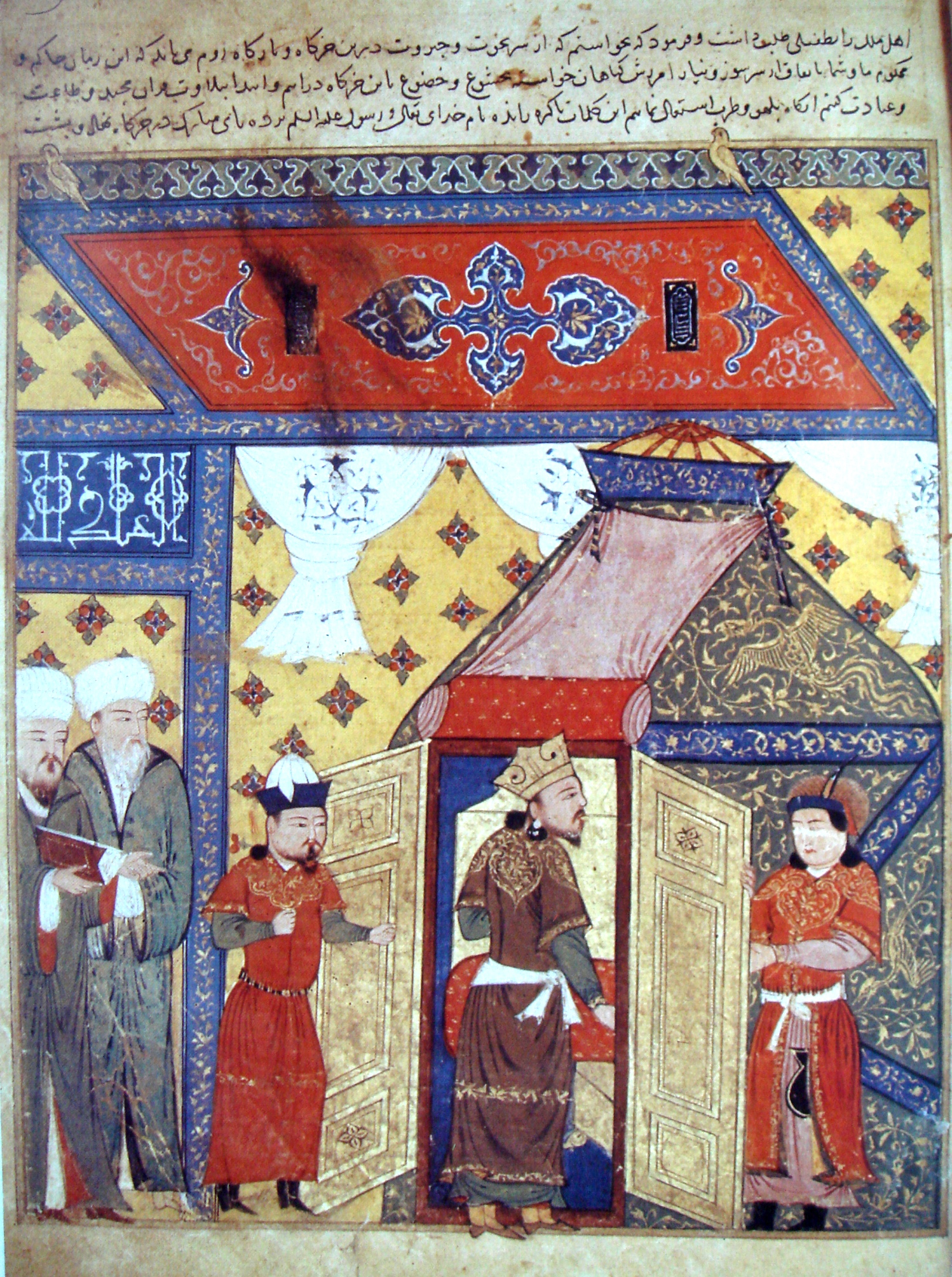
Persian miniature depicting Ghazan's conversion from Buddhism to Islam

At the time of Genghis Khan, virtually every religion had found Mongol converts, from Buddhism to Christianity, from Manichaeism to Islam. To avoid strife, Genghis Khan set up an institution that ensured complete religious freedom, though he himself was a shamanist. Under his administration, all religious leaders were exempt from taxation and from public service.

Initially there were few formal places of worship because of the nomadic lifestyle. However, under Ögedei (1186–1241), several building projects were undertaken in the Mongol capital. Along with palaces, Ögedei built houses of worship for the Buddhist, Muslim, Christian, and Taoist followers. The dominant religions at that time were Tengrism and Buddhism, although Ögedei's wife was a Nestorian Christian.

Eventually, each of the successor states adopted the dominant religion of the local populations: the Mongol-ruled Chinese Yuan dynasty in the East (originally the Great Khan's domain) embraced Buddhism and Shamanism, while the three Western khanates adopted Islam.

=== Arts and literature ===
The oldest surviving literary work in the Mongolian language is The Secret History of the Mongols, which was written for the royal family some time after Genghis Khan's death in 1227. It is the most significant native account of Genghis's life and genealogy, covering his origins and childhood through to the establishment of the Mongol Empire and the reign of his son, Ögedei.

Another classic from the empire is the Jami' al-tawarikh, or "Universal History". It was commissioned in the early 14th century by the Ilkhan Ghazan Khan as a way of documenting the entire world's history, to help establish the Mongols' own cultural legacy.

Mongol scribes in the 14th century used a mixture of resin and vegetable pigments as a primitive form of correction fluid; this might be its first known usage. The Mongols appreciated the visual arts; their taste in portraiture was focused on their horses.

=== Science ===
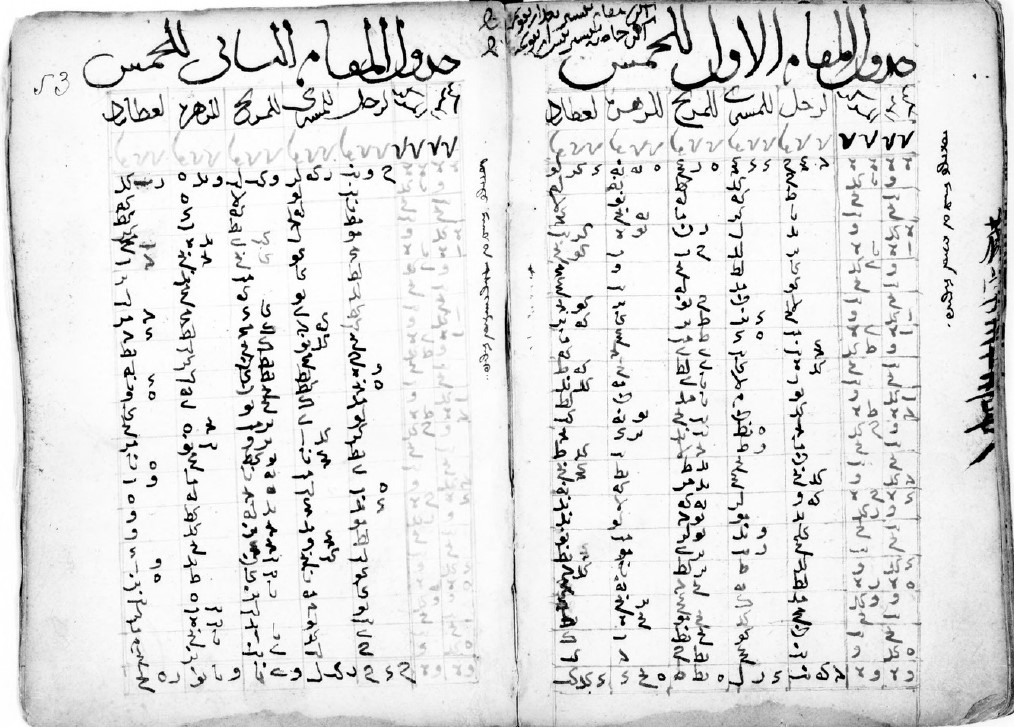
A 1363 astronomical handbook with Middle Mongolian glosses. Known as the Sanjufini Zij.

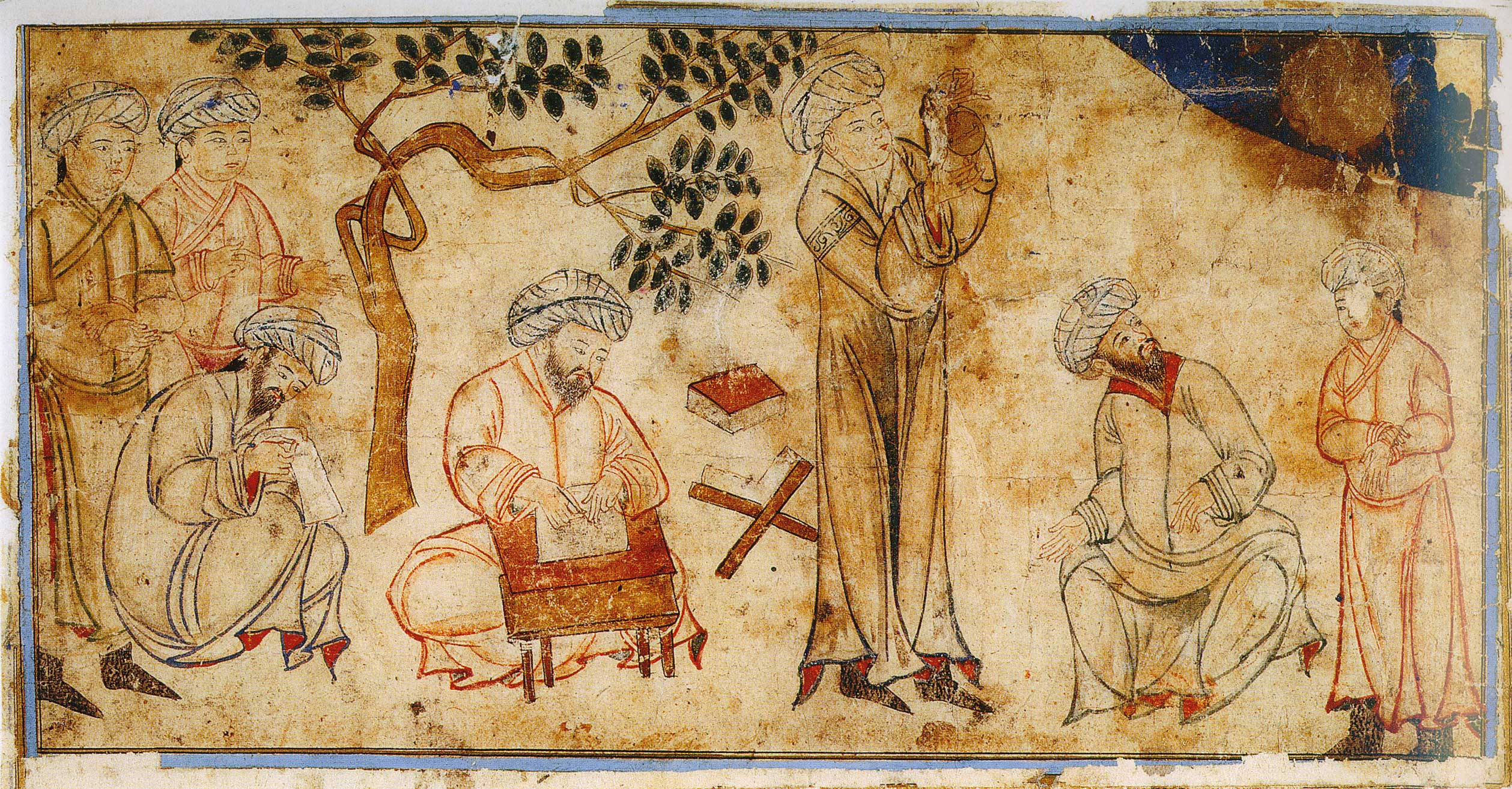
Mongols look on as Persian astronomers work. Early 14th-century illustration in the Compendium of Chronicles.

The Mongol Empire saw some significant developments in science due to the patronage of the Khans. Roger Bacon attributed the success of the Mongols as world conquerors principally to their devotion to mathematics. Astronomy was one branch of science that the Khans took a personal interest in. According to the Yuanshi, Ögedei Khan twice ordered the armillary sphere of Zhongdu to be repaired (in 1233 and 1236) and also ordered in 1234 the revision and adoption of the Damingli calendar. He built a Confucian temple for Yelü Chucai in Karakorum around 1236 where Yelü Chucai created and regulated a calendar on the Chinese model. Möngke Khan was noted by Rashid al-Din as having solved some of the difficult problems of Euclidean geometry on his own and written to his brother Hulagu Khan to send him the astronomer Tusi. Möngke Khan's desire to have Tusi build him an observatory in Karakorum did not reach fruition as the Khan died on campaign in southern China. Hulagu Khan instead gave Tusi a grant to build the Maragheh Observatory in Persia in 1259 and ordered him to prepare astronomical tables for him in 12 years, despite Tusi asking for 30 years. Tusi successfully produced the Ilkhanic Tables in 12 years, produced a revised edition of Euclid's elements and taught the innovative mathematical device called the Tusi couple. The Maragheh observatory held around 400,000 books salvaged by Tusi from the siege of Baghdad and other cities. Chinese astronomers brought by Hulagu Khan worked there as well.

Kublai Khan built a number of large observatories in China and his libraries included the Wu-hu-lie-ti (Euclid) brought by Muslim mathematicians. Zhu Shijie and Guo Shoujing were notable mathematicians in Yuan China. The Mongol physician Hu Sihui described the importance of a healthy diet in a 1330 medical treatise.

Ghazan Khan, able to understand four languages including Latin, built the Tabriz Observatory in 1295. The Byzantine Greek astronomer Gregory Chioniades studied there under Ajall Shams al-Din Omar who had worked at Maragheh under Tusi. Chioniades played an important role in transmitting several innovations from the Islamic world to Europe. These include the introduction of the universal latitude-independent astrolabe to Europe and a Greek description of the Tusi-couple, which would later have an influence on Copernican heliocentrism. Choniades also translated several Zij treatises into Greek, including the Persian Zij-i Ilkhani by al-Tusi and the Maragheh observatory. The Byzantine-Mongol alliance and the fact that the Empire of Trebizond was an Ilkhanate vassal facilitated Choniades' movements between Constantinople, Trebizond and Tabriz. Prince Radna, the Mongol viceroy of Tibet based in Gansu province, patronized the Samarkandi astronomer al-Sanjufini. The Arabic astronomical handbook dedicated by al-Sanjufini to Prince Radna, a descendant of Kublai Khan, was completed in 1363. It is notable for having Middle Mongolian glosses on its margins.

=== Mail system ===
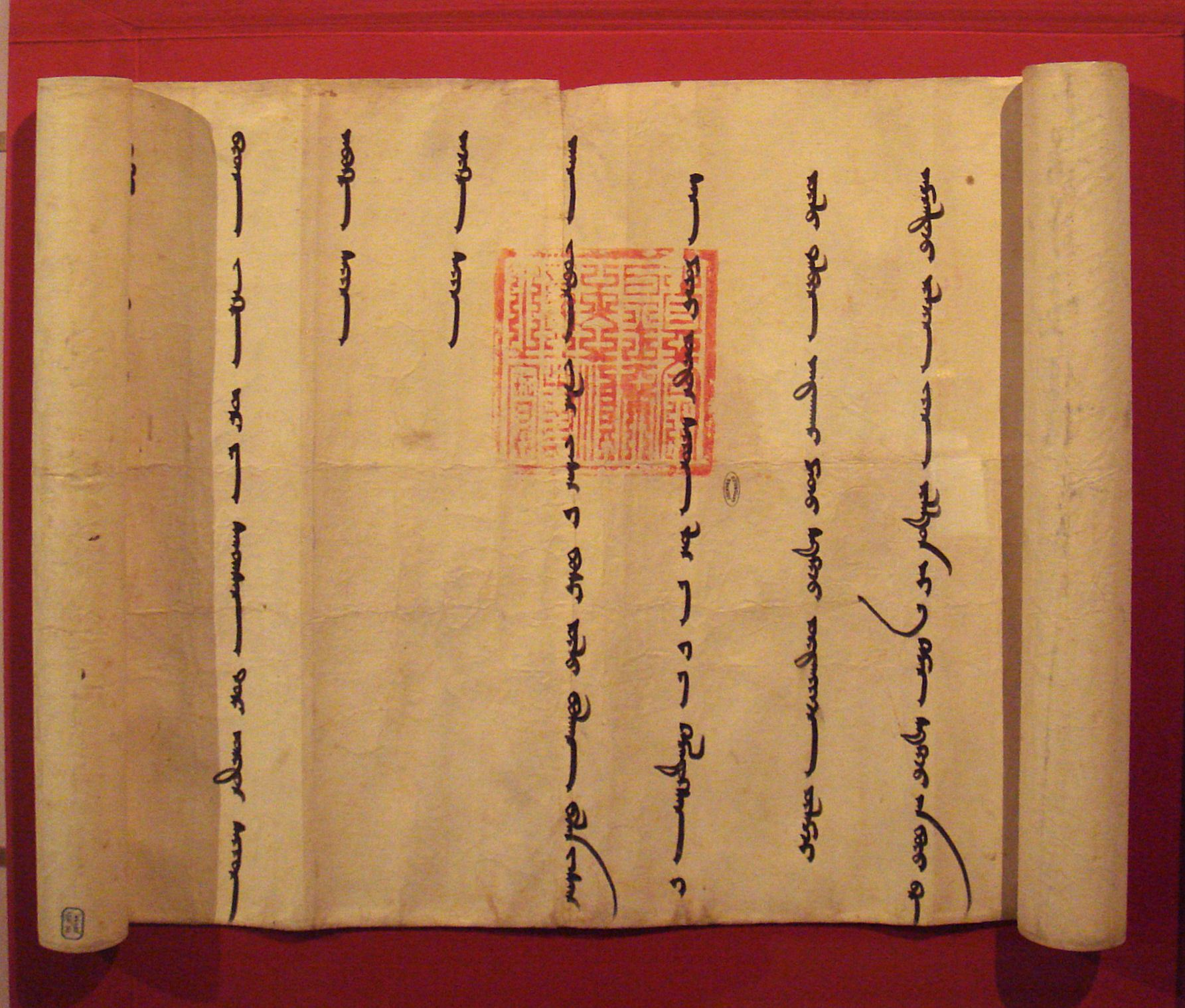
1305 letter from the Ilkhan Mongol Öljaitü to King Philip IV of France

The Mongol Empire had an ingenious and efficient mail system for the time, often referred to by scholars as the Yam. It had lavishly furnished and well-guarded relay posts known as örtöö set up throughout the Empire. A messenger would typically travel 40 kilometres (25 miles) from one station to the next, either receiving a fresh, rested horse, or relaying the mail to the next rider to ensure the speediest possible delivery. The Mongol riders regularly covered 200 km (125 mi) per day, better than the fastest record set by the Pony Express 600 years later. The relay stations had attached households to service them. Anyone with a paiza was allowed to stop there for re-mounts and specified rations, while those carrying military identities used the Yam even without a paiza. Many merchants, messengers, and travelers from China, the Middle East, and Europe used the system. When the great khan died in Karakorum, news reached the Mongol forces under Batu Khan in Central Europe within 4–6 weeks thanks to the Yam.

Genghis and his successor Ögedei built a wide system of roads, one of which carved through the Altai mountains. After his enthronement, Ögedei further expanded the road system, ordering the Chagatai Khanate and Golden Horde to link up roads in western parts of the Mongol Empire.

Kublai Khan, founder of the Yuan dynasty, built special relays for high officials, as well as ordinary relays, that had hostels. During Kublai's reign, the Yuan communication system consisted of some 1,400 postal stations, which used 50,000 horses, 8,400 oxen, 6,700 mules, 4,000 carts, and 6,000 boats. In Manchuria and southern Siberia, the Mongols still used dogsled relays for the Yam. In the Ilkhanate, Ghazan restored the declining relay system in the Middle East on a restricted scale. He constructed hostels and decreed that only imperial envoys could receive a stipend. The Jochids of the Golden Horde financed their relay system by a special Yam tax.

== Silk Road ==
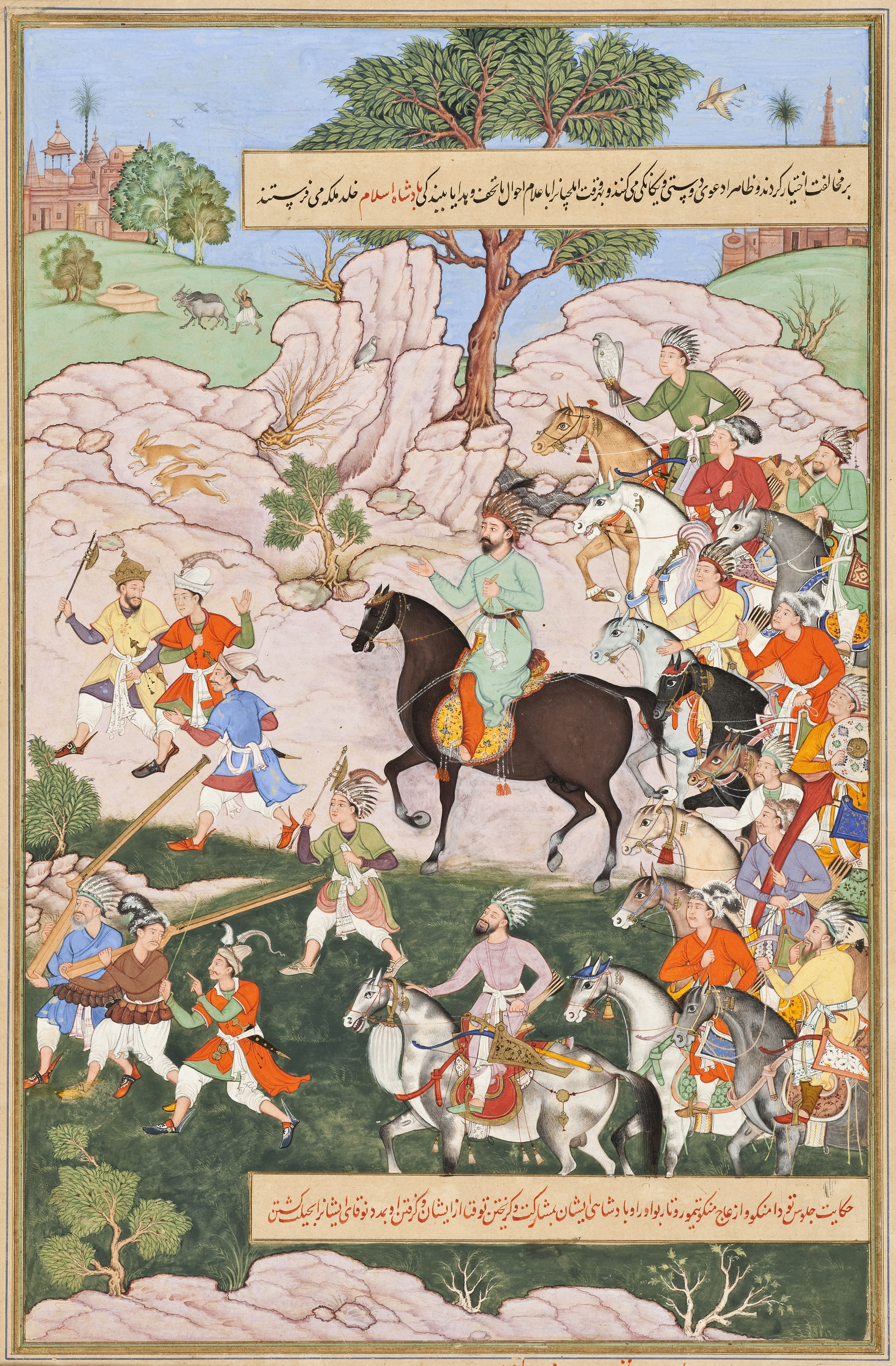
Tuda Mengu of the Golden Horde

The Mongol unification in 1206 and subsequent peace in the region allowed for trade routes to form through the Mongol Empire. The Mongols had a history of supporting merchants and trade. Genghis Khan had encouraged foreign merchants early in his career, even before uniting the Mongols. Merchants provided information about neighboring cultures, served as diplomats and official traders for the Mongols, and were essential for many goods, since the Mongols produced little of their own.

Mongol government and elites provided capital for merchants and sent them far afield, in an ortoq (merchant partner) arrangement. In Mongol times, the contractual features of a Mongol-ortoq partnership closely resembled that of qirad and commenda arrangements, however, Mongol investors were not constrained using uncoined precious metals and tradable goods for partnership investments and primarily financed money-lending and trade activities. Moreover, Mongol elites formed trade partnerships with merchants from Italian cities, including the Polo family. As the empire grew, any merchants or ambassadors with proper documentation and authorization received protection and sanctuary as they traveled through Mongol realms. Well-traveled and relatively well-maintained roads linked lands from the Mediterranean basin to China, greatly increasing overland trade and resulting in some dramatic stories of those who travelled through what would become known as the Silk Road.

Western explorer Marco Polo traveled east along the Silk Road, and the Uyghur monk Rabban Bar Sauma made a comparably epic journey along the route, venturing from his home of Khanbaliq (Beijing) as far as Europe. European missionaries, such as William of Rubruck, also traveled to the Mongol court to convert believers to their cause, or went as papal envoys to correspond with Mongol rulers in an attempt to secure a Franco-Mongol alliance. It was rare, however, for anyone to journey the full length of Silk Road. Instead, merchants moved products like a bucket brigade, goods being traded from one middleman to another, moving from China all the way to the West; the goods moved over such long distances fetched extravagant prices.

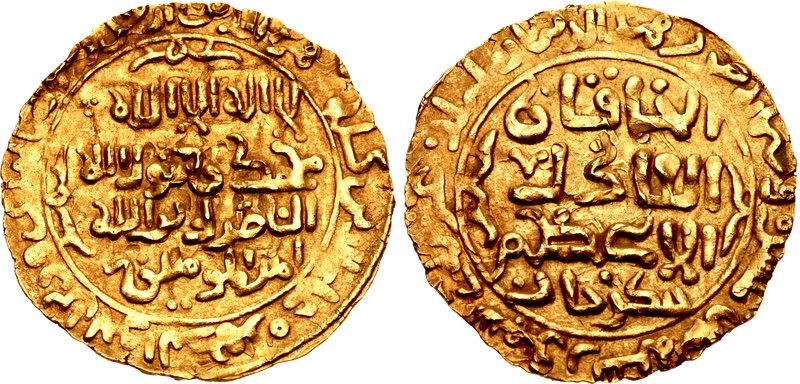
Gold dinar of Genghis Khan, struck at the Ghazna (Ghazni) mint, dated 1221/1222

After Genghis, the merchant partner business continued to flourish under his successors Ögedei and Güyük. Merchants brought clothing, food, information, and other provisions to the imperial palaces, and in return the great khans gave the merchants tax exemptions and allowed them to use the official relay stations of the Mongol Empire. Merchants also served as tax farmers in China, Rus and Iran. If the merchants were attacked by bandits, losses were made up from local residents who were obliged to find the stolen goods.

Policies changed under the Great Khan Möngke. Because of money laundering and overtaxing, he attempted to limit abuses and sent imperial investigators to supervise the ortoq businesses. He decreed that all merchants must pay commercial and property taxes, and he paid off all drafts drawn by high-ranking Mongol elites from the merchants. This policy continued under the Yuan dynasty.

The fall of the Mongol Empire in the 14th century led to the collapse of the political, cultural, and economic unity along the Silk Road. Turkic tribes seized the western end of the route from the Byzantine Empire, sowing the seeds of a Turkic culture that would later crystallize into the Ottoman Empire under the Sunni faith. In the East, the Han Chinese overthrew the Yuan dynasty in 1368, launching their own Ming dynasty and pursuing a policy of economic isolationism.

== Legacy ==
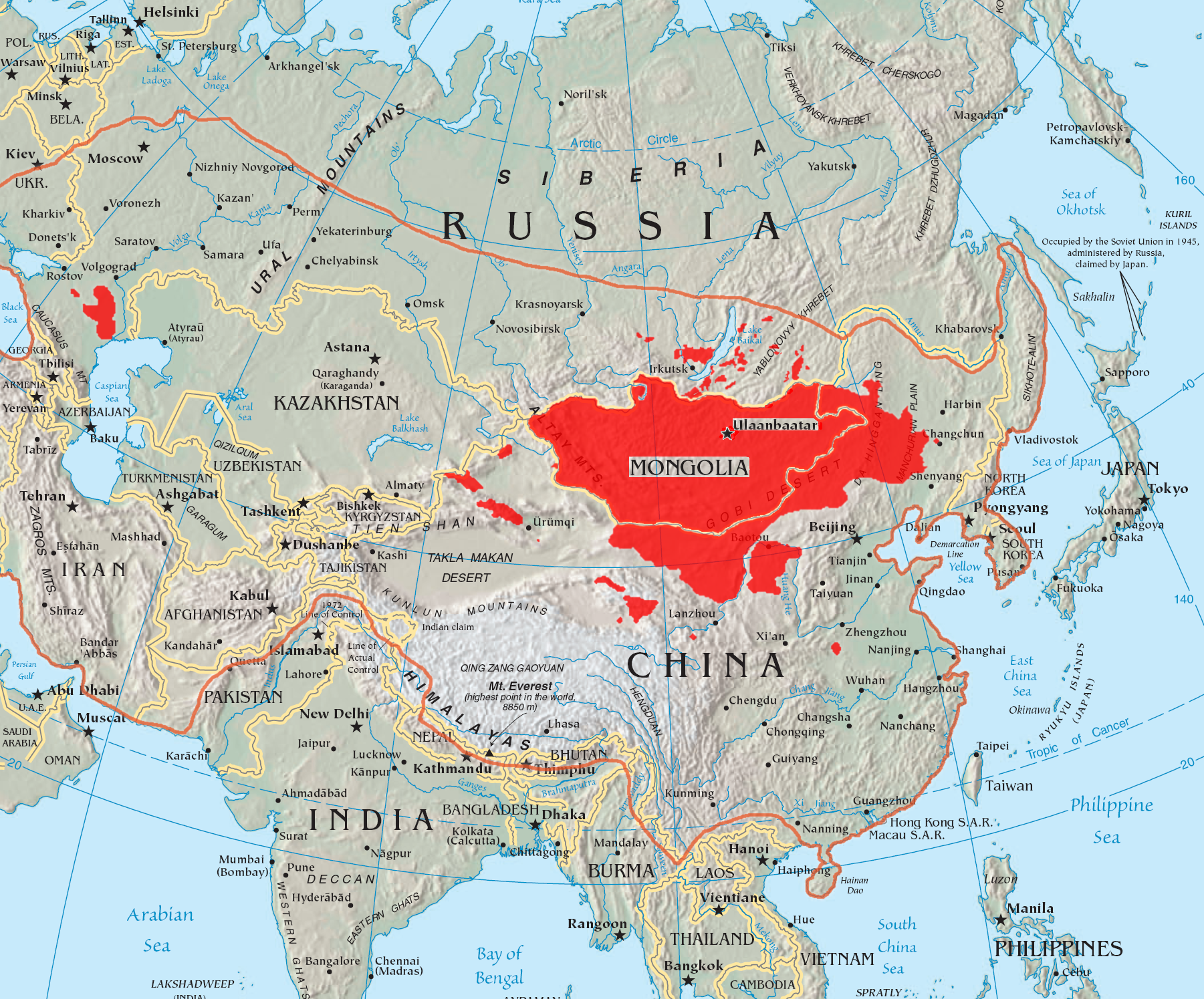
Map showing the boundary of the 13th-century Mongol Empire compared to today's Mongols in Mongolia, Russia, and China

The Mongol Empire, at its height of being the largest contiguous empire in history, had a lasting impact while unifying large regions. Some, such as eastern and western Russia, and western parts of China, remain unified today. Mongols might have assimilated into local populations after the fall of the empire, and some of their descendants adopted local religions. For example, the eastern khanate adopted Buddhism, and the three western khanates adopted Islam, largely under Sufi influence.

The non-military achievements of the Mongol Empire include the introduction of a writing system, a Mongol alphabet based on the characters of the Old Uyghur, which is still used in Mongolia.

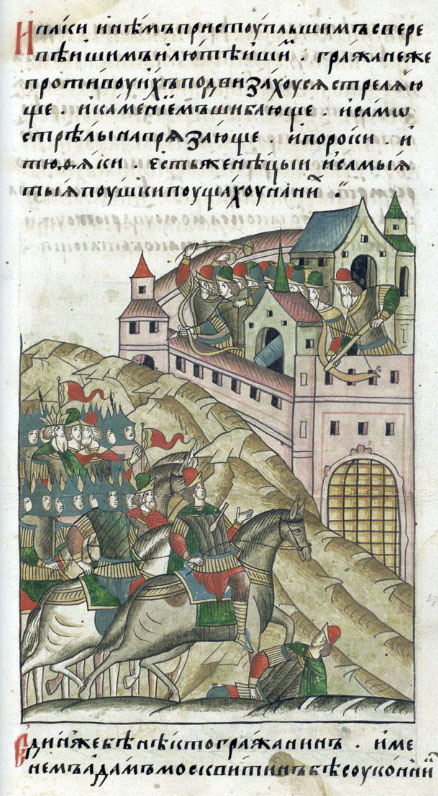
Tokhtamysh and the armies of the Golden Horde initiate the siege of Moscow in 1382.

Moscow rose to prominence while it was still under the rule of the Mongol-Tatar yoke, some time after Russian rulers were accorded the status of tax collectors for the Mongols. The fact that the Russians collected tribute and taxes for the Mongols meant that the Mongols themselves rarely visited the lands which they owned. The Russians eventually gained military power, and their ruler Ivan III completely overthrew the Mongols and formed the Russian Tsardom. After the Great Stand on the Ugra River proved that the Mongols were vulnerable, the Grand Duchy of Moscow gained independence.

Europe's knowledge of the known world was immensely expanded by the information which was brought back to it by ambassadors and merchants. When Christopher Columbus sailed in 1492, his mission was to reach Cathay, the land of the Grand Khan in China.

Some studies indicate the Black Death, which devastated Europe in the 1340s, may have traveled from China along the trade routes of the Mongol Empire. In 1347, the Genoese possessor of Caffa, a great trade emporium on the Crimean Peninsula, came under siege by an army of Mongol warriors under the command of Janibeg. After a protracted siege during which the Mongol army was reportedly withering from disease, they decided to use the infected corpses as a biological weapon. The corpses were catapulted over the city walls, infecting the inhabitants. The Genoese traders fled, transferring the plague via their ships into the south of Europe, from where it rapidly spread. The total number of deaths worldwide from the pandemic is estimated at 75–200 million with up to 50 million deaths in Europe alone.

=== Destruction ===
According to some interpretations, Genghis Khan's conquests caused wholesale destruction on an unprecedented scale in certain geographic regions, leading to changes in the demographics of Asia. Genghis and his hordes killed approximately 11% of the world's population, with the significant loss of human life even resulting in improvements in the environment's health. A 2003 study indicated 8% of men in Mongolia and 1 in 200 worldwide are direct descendants of Genghis.

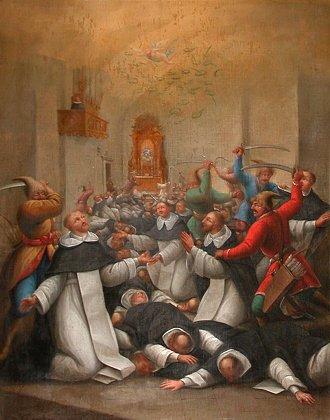
Dominican martyrs killed by Mongols during the Mongol invasion of Poland in 1260

Western researcher R. J. Rummel estimated that 30 million people were killed by the Mongol Empire. Other researchers estimate as many as 80 million. The population of China fell by half during fifty years of Mongol rule. Before the Mongol invasion, the territories of the Chinese dynasties reportedly had approximately 120 million inhabitants; after the conquest was completed in 1279, the 1300 census reported that China's total population was roughly 60 million. While it is possible to attribute this major decline in China's population solely to Mongol ferocity, scholars have mixed opinions. Frederick Mote argues the wide drop reflects an administrative failure to keep records rather than a decrease, while others such as Timothy Brook argue the Mongols reduced much of the south Chinese population, and debatably the Han Chinese population, to an invisible status through cancellation of the right to passports and denial of the right to direct land ownership. This meant the Chinese had to depend on and be cared for chiefly by Mongols and Tartars, which also involved recruitment into the Mongol army. Historians such as William McNeill and David O. Morgan argue that the bubonic plague was the main factor behind China's demographic decline.

The Islamic world was subjected to massive changes as a result of the Mongol invasions. The population of the Iranian plateau suffered from widespread disease and famine, resulting in the death of up to three-quarters of its population, possibly 10 to 15 million people. Historian Steven Ward estimates that Iran's population did not reach its pre-Mongol levels again until the mid-20th century.

David Nicole states in The Mongol Warlords, "terror and mass extermination of anyone opposing them was a well tested Mongol tactic." About half of the Russian population may have died during the invasion. However, Colin McEvedy estimates the population of Russia-in-Europe dropped from 7.5 million prior to the invasion to 7 million afterward. Historians estimate that up to half of Hungary's two million population were victims of the Mongol invasion. Rogerius, an eyewitness, said that "the Mongols killed everybody regardless of gender or age" and "the Mongols especially 'found pleasure' in humiliating women."

== See also ==
- Outline of the Mongol Empire
- Mongol dynasty (disambiguation)
- Mongol khanate (disambiguation)
- List of medieval Mongol tribes and clans
- List of Mongol states
