= Outline of the Mongol Empire =

Overview and topical guide of the Mongol Empire

The following is an outline and topical guide to the Mongol Empire:

The Mongol Empire was a 13th and 14th century nomadic empire and the largest contiguous empire in all of history.

== General reference ==
- Common English country name(s):
  - Mongol Empire
  - Mongolian Empire
- Official names of the Mongol Empire:
  - ᠶᠡᠬᠡ ᠮᠣᠩᠭᠣᠯ ᠤᠯᠤᠰ (Yeke Mongɣol Ulus)
- Demonyms:
  - Mongol
- Languages spoken:
  - Middle Mongol
  - Turkic languages
  - Chinese
  - Persian

== Geography of the Mongol Empire ==
The Mongol Empire at its greatest extent in 1279

- Location:
  - Eurasia
    - Europe
      - Eastern Europe
    - Asia
      - Central Asia
      - East Asia
      - Middle East
      - South Asia
      - Southeast Asia
  - Northern Hemisphere

== Government and politics of the Mongol Empire ==
Genghis Khan, founder and first khan of the Mongol Empire

=== Noble titles ===
- Khagan
- Noyon
- Jinong
- Khan Khuu
- Mirza

=== Military of the Mongol Empire ===
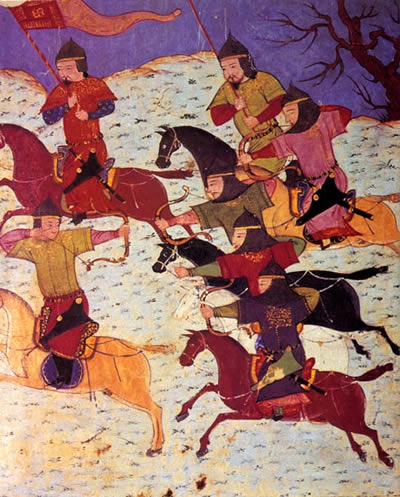
Mongol cavalry archery from Rashid-al-Din Hamadani's Universal History using the Mongol bow.

==== Weapons ====
- Battle axe
- Bombs
- Cannons
- Mongol bow
- Scimitar
- Spear

== General history of the Mongol Empire ==
Expansion of the Mongol Empire 1206–1294 superimposed on a modern political map of Eurasia

- Rise of Genghis Khan
  - Battle of Dalan Baljut
- Mongol conquest of China
  - Mongol conquest of Western Xia
    - Death of Genghis Khan
  - Mongol conquest of the Jin dynasty
  - Mongol conquest of the Song dynasty
  - Mongol conquest of the Dali Kingdom
- Mongol campaigns in Central Asia
  - Battle of Irtysh River
  - Mongol conquest of the Qara Khitai
  - Mongol invasion of the Khwarazmian Empire
- Mongol invasions of West Asia
  - Mongol invasion of Persia and Mesopotamia
    - Mongol invasion of the Khwarazmian Empire
    - Mongol campaign against the Nizaris
    - Siege of Baghdad
  - Mongol invasions of Georgia
  - Mongol invasions of Anatolia
  - Mongol invasions of the Levant
    - Lord Edward's crusade
- Mongol invasions of India
  - Mongol conquest of Kashmir
  - Mongol invasion of the Delhi Sultanate
- Mongol invasions of Europe
  - Mongol invasion of Kievan Rus'
  - Mongol invasion of Volga Bulgaria
  - Mongol invasion of Circassia
  - First Mongol invasion of Poland
  - First Mongol invasion of Hungary
    - Mongol invasion of Croatia
  - Mongol incursions in the Holy Roman Empire
  - Mongol invasion of Bulgaria and Serbia
  - Mongol invasion of the Latin Empire
  - Second Mongol invasion of Poland
  - Mongol invasions of Durdzuketi
- Mongol invasions of Korea
  - First Mongol invasion of Korea
  - Second Mongol invasion of Korea
  - Third Mongol invasion of Korea
  - Fourth Mongol invasion of Korea
  - Fifth Mongol invasion of Korea
  - Sixth Mongol invasion of Korea
  - Seventh Mongol invasion of Korea
  - Eighth Mongol invasion of Korea
- Mongol invasion of Tibet
- Mongol invasions of Vietnam
  - First Mongol invasion of Đại Việt
  - Mongol invasion of Champa
  - Second Mongol invasion of Đại Việt
  - Third Mongol invasion of Đại Việt
- Kublai Khan's campaigns
  - Mongol conquest of the Song dynasty
  - Mongol invasions of Korea
  - Mongol invasions of Japan
    - First Mongol invasion of Japan
    - Second Mongol invasion of Japan
  - First Mongol invasion of Burma
  - Mongol invasion of Champa
  - Second Mongol invasion of Đại Việt
  - Third Mongol invasion of Đại Việt
  - Mongol invasion of Java
- Mongol invasions of Japan
  - First Mongol invasion of Japan
    - Battle of Bun'ei
  - Second Mongol invasion of Japan
    - Battle of Kōan

== See also ==
- Outline of Mongolia
