= Mongol khanate =

Mongol khanate or Mongolian khanate can refer to:

- Khanate of the Khamag Mongol (10th century–1206)
- Mongol Empire (1206-1368)
  - Yuan dynasty
  - Golden Horde
  - Chagatai Khanate
  - Ilkhanate
- Northern Yuan (1368-1635)
- Kara Del (c. 1389–1513)
- Kalmyk Khanate (1630-1771)
- Dzungar Khanate (1634–1758)
- Khoshut Khanate (1642-1717)
- Bogd Khanate of Mongolia (1911-1924)

== See also ==
- Mongol dynasty (disambiguation)
