= Mongol dynasty =

Mongol dynasty can refer to:

- Yuan dynasty
- Borjigin dynasty
- Barlas dynasty
- Timurid dynasty
- Mughal dynasty

== See also ==
- Mongol khanate (disambiguation)
