= Battle of Dalan Baljut =

12th century battle between Temüjin and Jamukha

Battle of Dalan Balzhut
- Part of Rise of Genghis Khan
Date	c. 1187
Location	Near the Onon River
Result	Jamukha victory

Belligerents
Jamukha's faction	Temüjin's faction

Commanders and leaders
Jamukha	Temüjin

Strength
30,000	Unknown

The Battle of Dalan Baljut was fought in 1187 between Temüjin (later known as Genghis Khan) and Jamukha, his blood brother. Although Temüjin and Jamukha were close friends for many years, they began to drift apart as time went on. Central to this split was the political system each of them supported—Jamukha held up the traditional Mongol aristocracy, whereas Temüjin believed that a meritocracy would be best. Temüjin was able to find several successes, most notably in attracting a broad range of followers (including lower classes), a successful campaign against the Merkits and the shaman Kokochu proclaiming "... that the Eternal Blue Sky had set aside the world for Temüjin". In c. 1186, Temüjin was elected Khan of the Mongols, threatening Jamukha's power which led him to attack Temüjin with 30,000 troops the next year. Temüjin was decisively defeated in the ensuing battle and fled, with the next 10 years of his life unclear. After the battle, Jamukha boiled 70 young male captives alive, horrifying and alienating potential followers.
