= Yuan dynasty in Inner Asia =

Historical territories of the Mongol-led Yuan dynasty

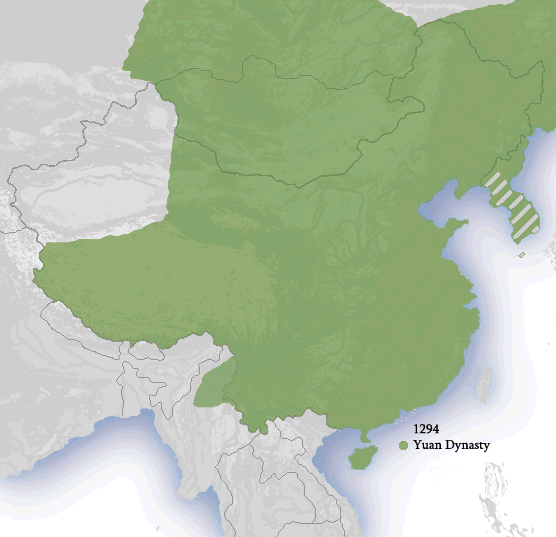
Yuan dynasty, c. 1294.

The Yuan dynasty (1271–1368) ruled over large territories in Inner Asia in the 13th and the 14th centuries. The Borjigin rulers of the Yuan came from the Mongolian steppe, and the Mongols under Kublai Khan established the Yuan dynasty based in Dadu (modern-day Beijing). The Yuan was an imperial dynasty of China that incorporated many aspects of Mongol and Han political and military institutions.

The Yuan dynasty ruled over most of modern-day China, Korea, Mongolia, and parts of Siberia (Russia). Specifically, Yuan rule extended to Manchuria (modern-day Northeast China and Outer Manchuria), Mongolia, southern Siberia, the Tibetan Plateau and parts of Xinjiang. People within the Yuan dynasty belonged to either the Mongol, the Semu, the Northern or the Southern Han class. In addition, the Yuan emperors held nominal suzerainty over the three western Mongol khanates (the Golden Horde, the Chagatai Khanate and the Ilkhanate).

== Manchuria ==
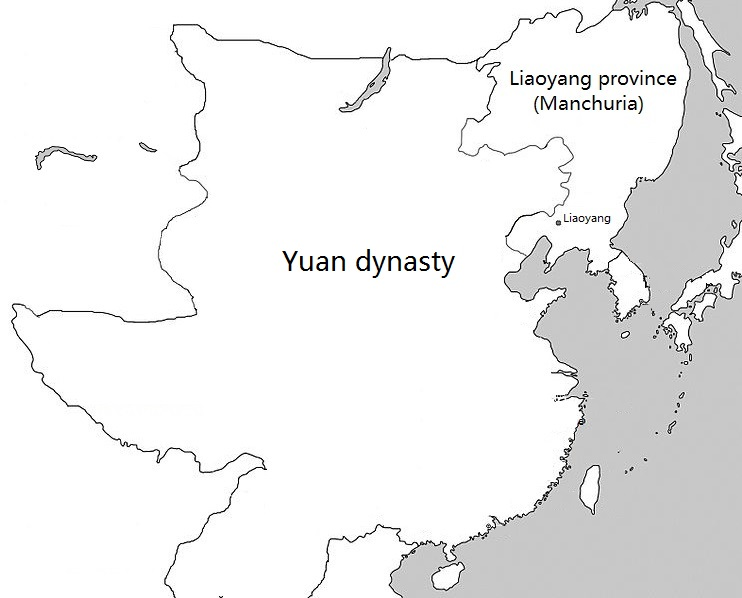
Manchuria within the Yuan dynasty.

Manchuria was originally ruled by the Han, Tang, Liao, and Jin dynasties before the emergence of the Mongol Empire in the early 13th century. During the Mongol conquest of the Jin dynasty (1211–1234), North China became ruled by Mongols, and Manchuria became part of the Yuan dynasty.

In 1269, the Yuan founder Kublai Khan set up the Liaoyang province (遼陽行省) which extended to Outer Manchuria and parts of Korea, whereas the Goryeo dynasty became a Yuan vassal. In 1286, the province was turned into a Xuanweisi (宣慰司). In 1287, the Liaoyang province was established again, and lasted until the end of the Yuan dynasty.

According to Yuanshi, the official history of the Yuan dynasty, the Mongols militarily invaded Sakhalin island and subdued the Guwei (骨嵬) there. By 1308, all inhabitants of Sakhalin had submitted to the Yuan dynasty. After the overthrow of the Yuan dynasty by the Ming dynasty in 1368, Mongols under Naghachu (originally a Yuan official) still controlled Manchuria, where he became a general of the Northern Yuan dynasty. The Ming then conquered and annexed Manchuria after its military campaign against Naghachu in 1387.

== Mongolia ==
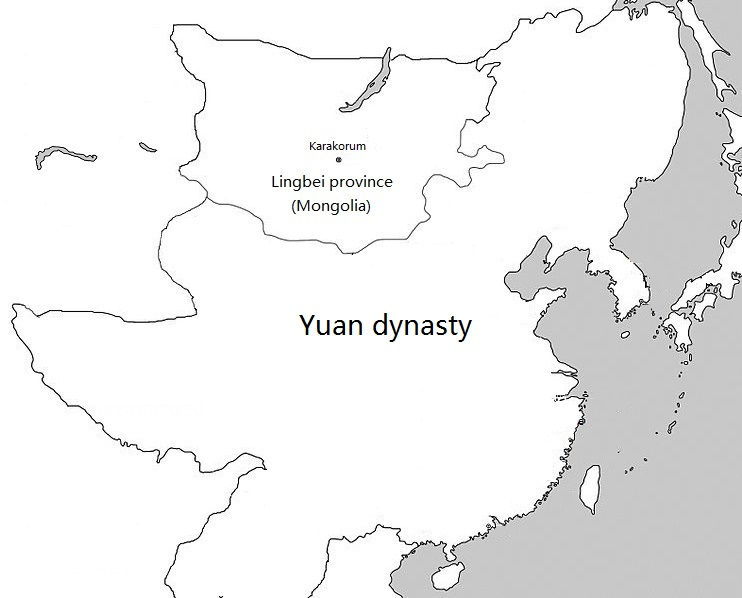
Mongolia within the Yuan dynasty.

The ethnic Mongol rulers of the Yuan dynasty came from the Mongolian steppe, and Karakorum was the capital of the Mongol Empire until 1260.

During the Toluid Civil War, Mongolia was controlled by Ariq Böke, a younger brother of Kublai Khan. After Kublai's victory over Ariq Böke, Mongolia was put within the Central Region (腹裏) directly governed by the Central Secretariat at the capital Dadu). However, it was shortly occupied by Kaidu, leader of the House of Ögedei and de facto khan of the Chagatai Khanate during his war with Kublai Khan, although it was later recovered by the Yuan commander Bayan of the Baarin.

Temur was later appointed a governor in Karakorum and Bayan became a minister.

During the rule of Külüg Khan, the third Yuan emperor, Mongolia was put under the Karakorum province (和林行省; Helin Province) in 1307, although parts of Inner Mongolia were still governed by the Central Secretariat.

The province was renamed to the Lingbei province (嶺北行省) by his successor Ayurbarwada Buyantu Khan in 1312. After the overthrow of the Yuan dynasty by the Ming dynasty in 1368, the Yuan court retreated north whilst maintaining the dynastic name of "Great Yuan" (thenceforth known as the Northern Yuan dynasty in historiography) and maintained control over northern China, the Mongolian Plateau and Siberia.

== Tibet ==
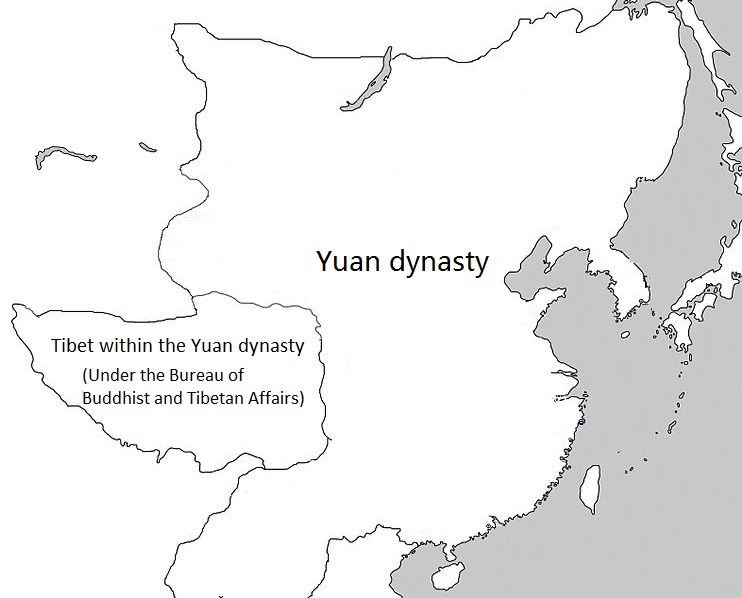
Tibet within the Yuan dynasty

After the Mongol conquest of Tibet in the 1240s, Tibet was incorporated into the Mongol Empire. After the enthronement of Kublai Khan, founder of the Yuan dynasty, Tibet was put under the Bureau of Buddhist and Tibetan Affairs or Xuanzheng Yuan, a government agency and top-level administrative department set up in Khanbaliq that supervised Buddhist monks in addition to managing the territory of Tibet.

Besides modern-day Tibet Autonomous Region, the Yuan also governed parts of Sichuan, Qinghai and Kashmir. It was separate from the other provinces of the Yuan dynasty such as those of former Song dynasty, but still under the administrative rule of the Yuan.

One of the department's purposes was to select a dpon-chen ('great administrator'), usually appointed by the lama and confirmed by the Yuan emperor in Beijing.

During the Yuan rule of Tibet, Tibet retained nominal power over religious and regional affairs, while the Yuan managed a structural and administrative rule over the region, reinforced by military intervention.

Tibetan Buddhism was one of the main state religions of the Yuan dynasty, and the Sakya leader Drogön Chögyal Phagpa became Imperial Preceptor of Kublai Khan.

Yuan control over the region ended with the overthrow of the Yuan dynasty by the Ming dynasty, the revolt of Tai Situ Changchub Gyaltsen against the Mongols, and the Ming's establishment of relations with Tibet.

== Xinjiang ==
The Mongol Empire began to rule modern-day Xinjiang during their conquest of the Qara Khitai (Western Liao). After the division of the Mongol Empire and the established of the Yuan dynasty by Kublai Khan, Xinjiang became a battle place between the Yuan dynasty and the Chagatai Khanate.

Kublai attempted to subject Kaidu to an economic siege by entrenching his forces in the Tarim basin and over the Uyghurs, cutting him off from these resources. In 1276 he stationed a garrison in Khotan and reinforced it several times between 1278 and 1283. In 1278 he stationed a garrison at Beshbalik, which from 1280 was under the Chinese general Qi Gongzhi. From 1281 to 1286 the garrison was reinforced, and the Chagatai prince Ajiqi was also sent to join the garrison. In 1281, 22 postal stations were set up between Beshbalik and Shanxi province, and more were set up to link Khotan and Cherchen in 1286. Military agricultural colonies (tuntian were set up in Beshbalik in 1283 and 1286, and more set up between Khotan and Cherchen in 1287 in response to a famine in the Tarim basin. In 1278 a Qara Qocho regional supervision bureau was established, which later become a Pacification bureau, and in 1281, a Beshbalik protectorate was established. Through these, Yuan law and currency was imposed on the region. However, these measures were unsuccessful as the entire region was repeatedly raided by Kaidu and his allies. From 1288 to 1289 the Yuan was forced to start withdrawing from Kashgar, Khotan and Beshbalik back to the interior of China.

The Yuan had shortly put most of present-day Xinjiang under its control under the Bechbaliq province (别失八里行省), but they were occupied by the Chagatai Khanate in 1286. After a long-time war between them, most of Xinjiang became under the control of the Chagatai Khanate, while the Yuan dynasty only retained control over the eastern part of Xinjiang. No province was set up again by the Yuan dynasty in Xinjiang, although the Yuan imperial court did set up an institution named Qara-hoja commandery "哈剌火州總管府" in eastern Xinjiang in 1330, which was directly governed by the Yuan dynasty. After the fall of the Yuan dynasty in 1368, the Kara Del khanate was founded in Hami by the Yuan prince Gunashiri, a descendant of Chagatai Khan.

== Suzerainty over western khanates ==
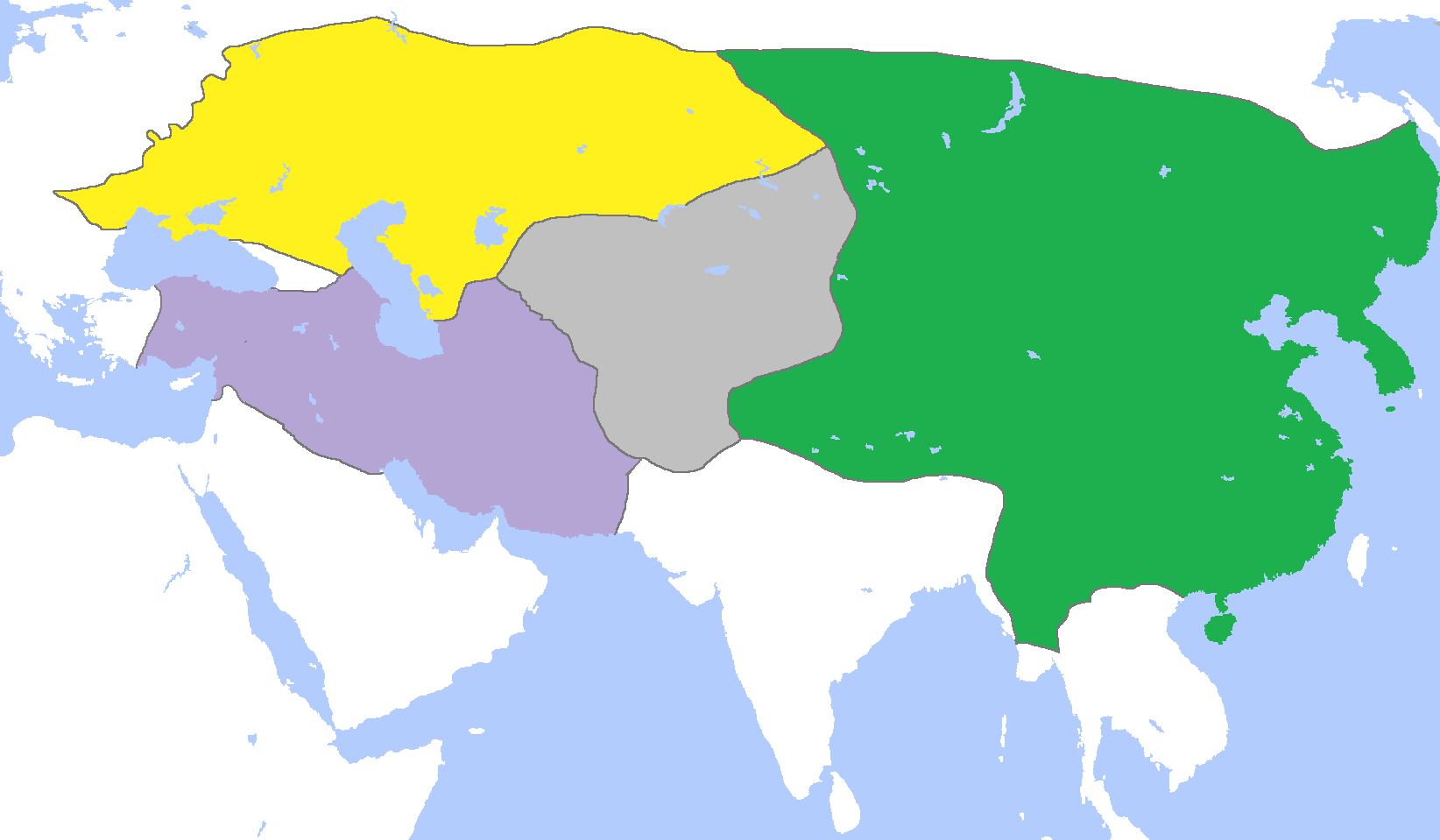
Yuan dynasty (in green) and the three western khanates, c. 1300.

The Yuan dynasty retained nominal political suzerainty over the whole Mongol Empire, including the three western khanates: the Golden Horde in Russia, the Chagatai Khanate in Central Asia and the Ilkhanate in Iran.

Khitan and Han Chinese administrators were sent to Bukhara and Samarqand to govern by the Mongols in the 1220s and this was witnessed by Qiu Chuji on his way to meet Genghis Khan in Afghanistan. Chinese siege engineers were deployed in Iran and Iraq by the Ilkhanate.

Han Chinese were sent to the Upper Yenisei valley as weavers, into Samarkand and Outer Mongolia as craftsmen as noticed by Ch'ang-ch'un in 1221-22 when he travelled to Kabul from Beijing and they moved to Russia and Iran. The Euphrates and Tigris basins were irrigated by Chinese hydraulic engineers and in 1258 at the siege of Baghdad one of Hulagu Khan's generals was Han Chinese. Because of the Mongols, Chinese influenced architecture, music, ceramics and Persian miniatures in the Golden Horde and Il-khan. Han Chinese, Mongols, Uighurs, Venetians and Geonese all lived in Tabriz were paper money was introduced and movable type printing and wood engraving as well as paper money, printed fabrics and playing cards spread from china to Europe due to the Mongols. wood engraving which was Chinese was mentioned in the 1313 book "Treasure of the Il-khan on the Sciences of Cathay" which was about Chinese medicine and translated by Rashid al-Din.

The Khitan Yelü Chucai was sent by the Mongols to Central Asia

Since the Toluid Civil War in the 1260s, the Mongol Empire over time politically fragmented into four khanates. Kublai Khan continued to hold the nominal title of Khagan and claimed the rule over the whole Mongol Empire, but he was unable to do so due to the disintegrated nature of the empire. The Berke–Hulagu war along with the Kaidu–Kublai war (1268–1301) that lasted a few decades accelerated this process.

After the death of Kublai Khan in 1294 and the Islamization of the Ilkhanate in 1295, Ilkhan Ghazan sent his envoys to greet Kublai Khan's successor and second Yuan emperor Temür in 1298, who responded favorably. The Ilkhanid envoys presented tribute to Temür and inspected properties granted to Hulagu in North China. They stayed at the Yuan capital (Khanbaliq, modern Beijing) for four years. The Ilkhanate, while functionally autonomous, remained the most friendly khanate to the Yuan dynasty among the three western khanates until its downfall in the 1330s.

Around 1300, Kaidu and Duwa of the Chagatai Khanate mobilized a large army to attack Karakorum (under Yuan control) during the final stage of the Kaidu–Kublai war. The Yuan army suffered heavy losses while both sides could not make any decisive victory in September. Duwa was wounded in the battle and Kaidu died soon thereafter. After that, Duwa, Kaidu's son Chapar, Tokhta of the Golden Horde and Ilkhan Oljeitu (Ghazan's successor) negotiated peace with Temür Khan in 1304 and agreed him to be their nominal overlord. This established the nominal suzerainty of the Yuan dynasty over the western khanates.

In 1306, more fighting between Duwa and Chapar soon broke out over the question of territory. Temür backed Duwa and sent a large army under Khayisan in the fall of 1306, and Chapar finally surrendered. The territory controlled by Chapar was divided up by the Chagataids and the Yuan. The nominal supremacy of the Yuan, based on the same foundations as that of the earlier Khagans (even though there were continued border clashes among them), lasted until 1368, when the Yuan dynasty was replaced by the Ming dynasty in China.

Rashid al-din said that the Chinese millet grain known as tuki was brought by Han Chinese first to Marv in Turkmenistan and then to Iranian Azerbaijan in Khoy and Tabriz. Later Han Chinese were reported to be the most significant ethnicity generations later in Khoi around 1340 when Mustawfi wrote about them.

The Tabriz-based Rob'-e Rashidi and the Maraghe observatory in Ilkhanid Iran had scientists and scholars of Chinese origin. The "Book of Precious Presents or the Medicine of the Chinese People" (Tansuq-name ya tebb-e ahl-e Kheta) was translated by people working under Rashid-al-Din Fazl-Allah to Persian from Chinese and it was about Chinese medicine.

The four khanates continued to interact with one another in the first half of the 14th century. They formed alliances, fought one another, exchanged envoys, and traded commercial products. In the case of the Yuan dynasty based in China and the Ilkhanate based in Iran, there was an extensive program of cultural and scientific interaction, while exercising extensive autonomy in the conduct of their internal affairs. This also set an example for the later cultural and scientific interaction between the Ming dynasty in China and the Timurid Empire in Iran.

== See also ==
- Administrative divisions of the Yuan dynasty
- Bureau of Buddhist and Tibetan Affairs
- Mongol invasions and conquests
- Division of the Mongol Empire
- Semu
- Han dynasty in Inner Asia
- Tang dynasty in Inner Asia
- Ming dynasty in Inner Asia
- Qing dynasty in Inner Asia
