= Division of the Mongol Empire =

Fragmentation of the Mongol Empire post-1259

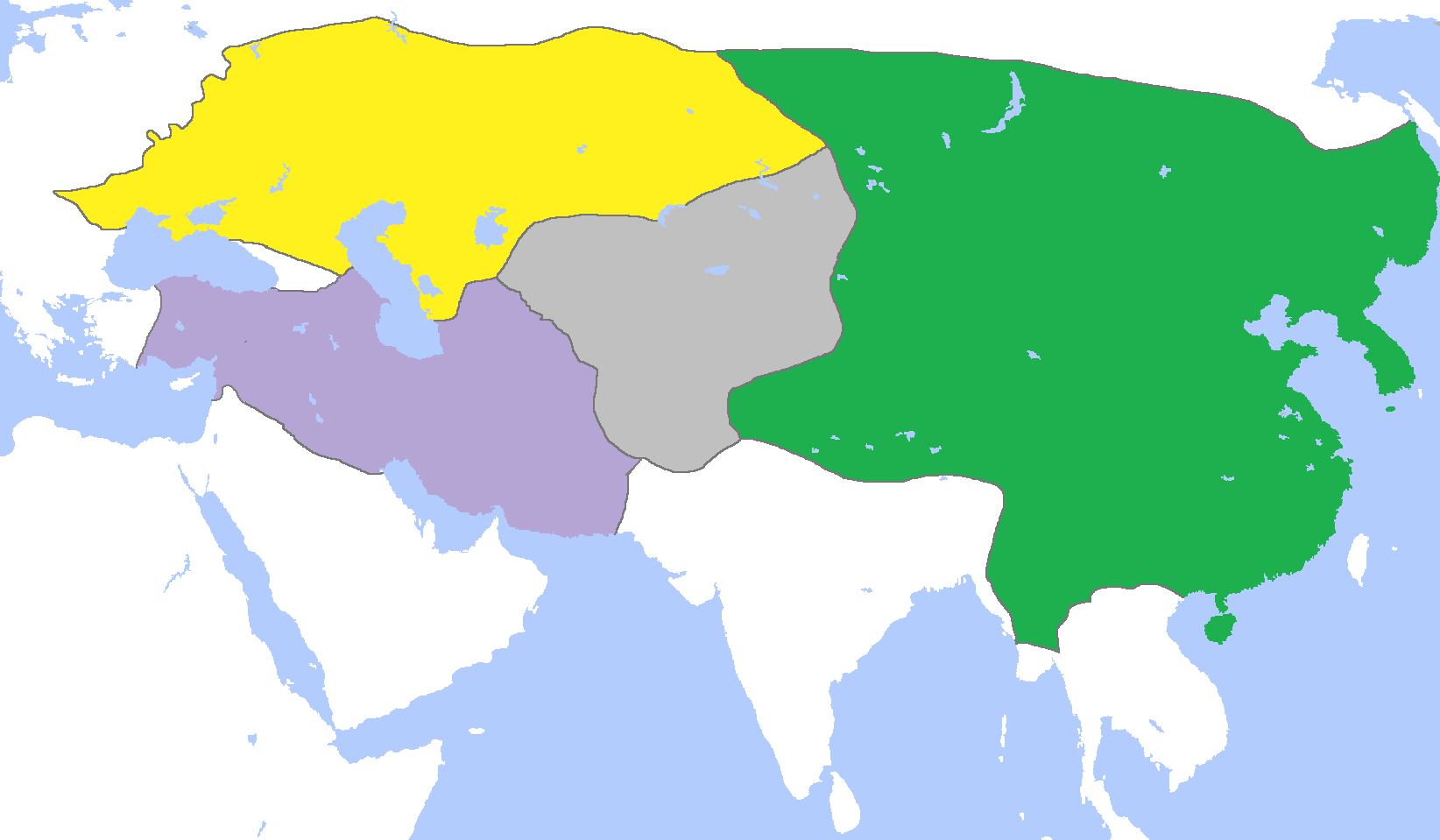
- Fragmentation of the Mongol Empire
- Date: 1260–1294
- Location: Mongol Empire
- Cause: Death of Möngke Khan, resulting in a succession war
- Participants: Yuan dynasty (green); Ilkhanate (purple); Chagatai Khanate (gray); Golden Horde (yellow)
- Outcome: The Mongol Empire fractured into four separate khanates

The division of the Mongol Empire began after Möngke Khan died in 1259 in the siege of Diaoyu Castle with no declared successor, precipitating infighting between members of the Tolui family line for the title of khagan that escalated into the Toluid Civil War. This civil war, along with the Berke–Hulagu war and the subsequent Kaidu–Kublai war, greatly weakened the authority of the great khan over the entirety of the Mongol Empire, and the empire fractured into four khanates: the Golden Horde in Eastern Europe, the Chagatai Khanate in Central Asia, the Ilkhanate in Iran, and the Yuan dynasty (Note: As per modern historiographical norm, the "Yuan dynasty" in this article refers exclusively to the realm based in Dadu (present-day Beijing). However, the Han-style dynastic name "Great Yuan" (大元) as proclaimed by Kublai, as well as the claim to Chinese political orthodoxy were meant to be applied to the entire Mongol Empire. In spite of this, "Yuan dynasty" is rarely used in the broad sense of the definition by modern scholars due to the de facto disintegrated nature of the Mongol Empire.) in China based in modern-day Beijing—although the Yuan emperors held the nominal title of khagan of the empire.

The four divisions each pursued their own interests and objectives and fell at different times. Most of the western khanates did not recognize Kublai as Great Khan. Although some of them still asked Kublai to confirm the enthronement of their new regional khans, the four khanates were functionally independent sovereign states. The Ilkhanate and the Yuan dynasty had close diplomatic relations, and shared scientific and cultural knowledge, but military cooperation between all four Mongol khanates would never occur again—the united Mongol Empire had disintegrated.

== Dispute over succession ==
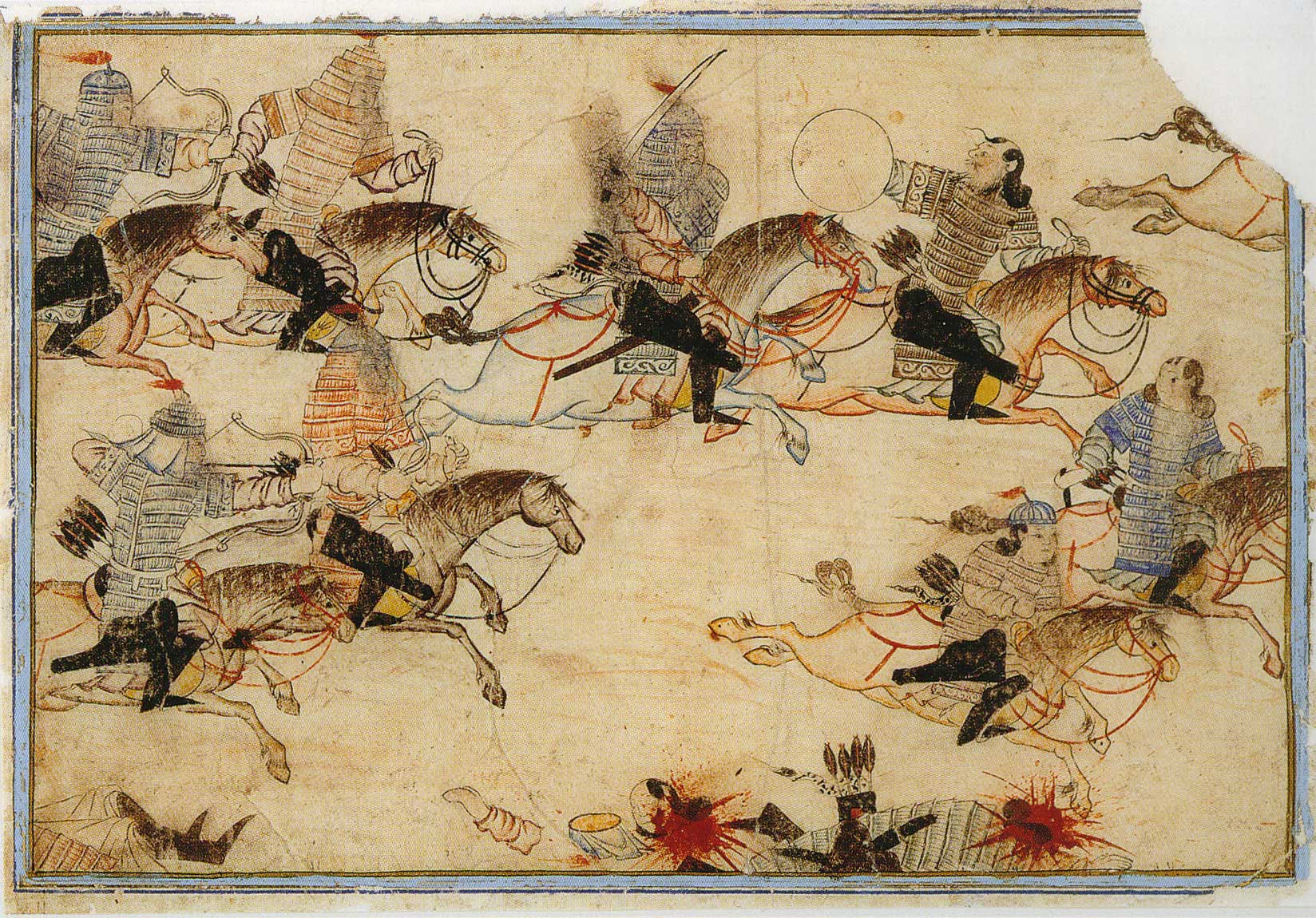
The Mongols at war

Möngke Khan's brother Hulagu Khan broke off his successful military advance into Syria, withdrawing the bulk of his forces to the Mughan plain and leaving only a small contingent under his general Kitbuqa. The opposing forces in the region, the Christian Crusaders and Muslim Mamluks, both recognizing that the Mongols were the greater threat, took advantage of the weakened state of the Mongol army and engaged in an unusual passive truce with each other.

In 1260, the Mamluks advanced from Egypt, being allowed to camp and resupply near the Christian stronghold of Acre, and engaged Kitbuqa's forces just north of Galilee, at the Battle of Ain Jalut. The Mongols were defeated, and Kitbuqa was executed. This pivotal battle marked the western limit for Mongol expansion, as the Mongols were never again able to make any serious military advances farther than Syria.

In a separate part of the empire, another brother of Hulagu and Möngke, Kublai, heard of the great khan's death at the Huai River in China proper. Rather than returning to the capital, he continued his advance into Wuchang, near the Yangtze River. Their younger brother Ariq Böke took advantage of the absence of Hulagu and Kublai, and used his position at the capital to win the title of great khan (khagan) for himself, with representatives of all the family branches proclaiming him as the leader at the kurultai in Karakorum. When Kublai learned of this, he summoned his own kurultai at Kaiping, where virtually all the senior princes and great noyans resident in North China and Manchuria supported his own candidacy over that of Ariq Böke.

== Civil war ==
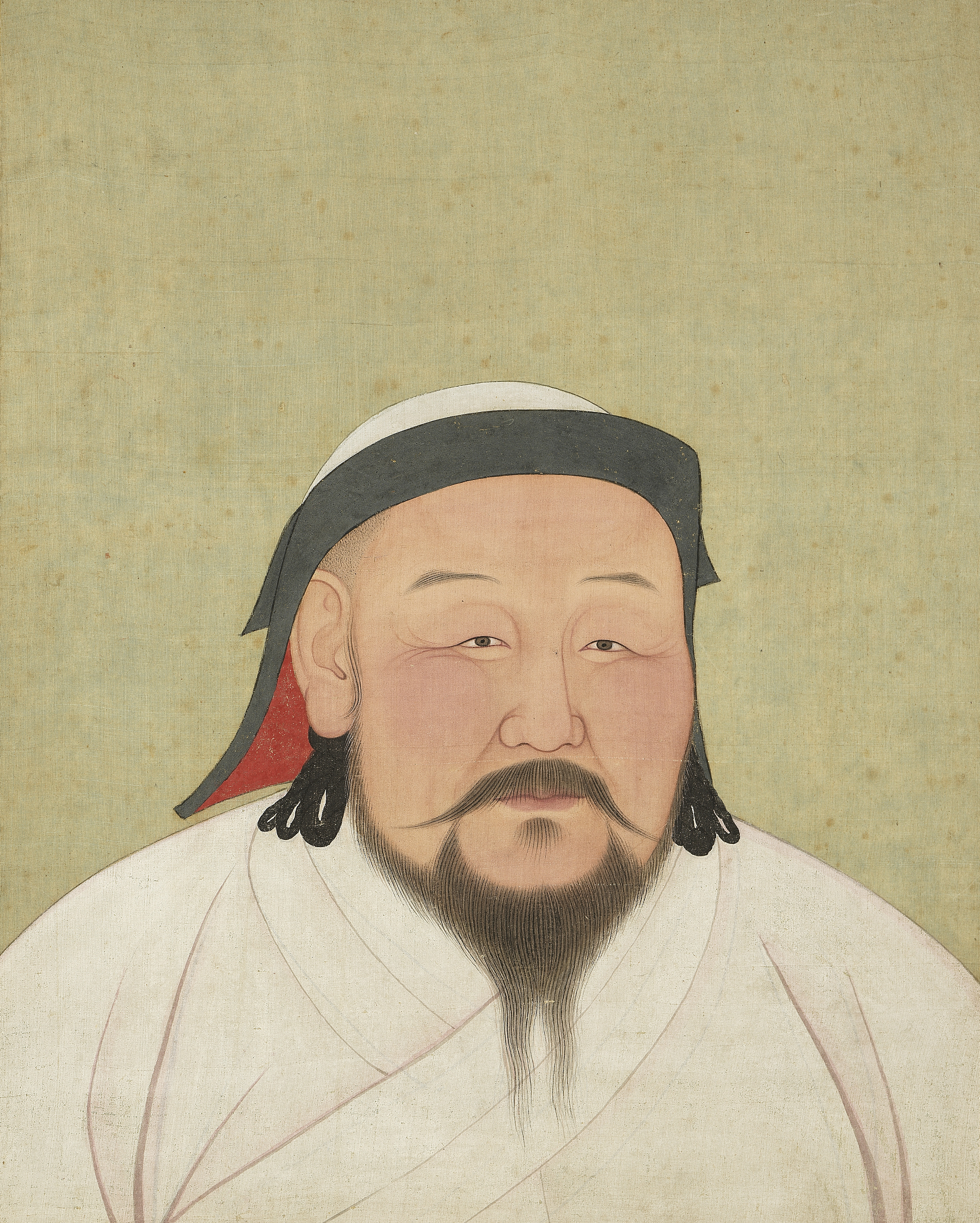
Kublai Khan (Emperor Shizu of Yuan), Genghis Khan's grandson and founder of the Yuan dynasty

Battles ensued between the armies of Kublai and those of his brother Ariq Böke, which included forces still loyal to Möngke's previous administration. Kublai's army easily eliminated Ariq Böke's supporters and seized control of the civil administration in southern Mongolia. Further challenges took place from their cousins, the Chagataids. Kublai sent Abishka, a Chagataid prince loyal to him, to take charge of Chagatai's realm. However, Ariq Böke captured and then executed Abishka, having his own man Alghu crowned there instead. Kublai's new administration blockaded Ariq Böke in Mongolia to cut off food supplies, causing a famine. Karakorum fell quickly to Kublai, but Ariq Böke rallied and retook the capital in 1261.

In the southwestern Ilkhanate, Hulagu was loyal to his brother Kublai, but clashes with their cousin Berke, the ruler of the Golden Horde in the northwestern part of the empire, began in 1262. The suspicious deaths of Jochid princes in Hulagu's service, unequal distribution of war booty, and Hulagu's massacres of the Muslims increased the anger of Berke, who considered supporting a rebellion of the Kingdom of Georgia against Hulagu's rule in 1259–1260. Berke also forged an alliance with the Egyptian Mamluks against Hulagu and supported Kublai's rival claimant, Ariq Böke.

Hulagu died on 8 February 1265. Berke sought to take advantage and invade Hulagu's realm, but he died along the way, and a few months later, Alghu Khan of the Chagatai Khanate died as well. Kublai named Hulagu's son Abaqa as a new ilkhan, and Abaqa sought foreign alliances, such as attempting to form a Franco-Mongol alliance with the Europeans against the Egyptian Mamluks. Kublai nominated Batu's grandson Möngke Temür to lead the Golden Horde. Ariq Böke surrendered to Kublai at Shangdu on 21 August 1264.

== Disintegration into four khanates ==
The establishment of the Yuan dynasty (1271–1368) by Kublai (Emperor Shizu) accelerated the fragmentation of the Mongol Empire. The Mongol Empire fractured into four khanates. Two of these, the Yuan dynasty and the Ilkhanate, were ruled by the line of Tolui. The Golden Horde was founded by the line of Jochi, while the Chagatai Khanate was founded by the line of Chagatai. In 1304, a peace treaty among the khanates established the nominal supremacy of the Yuan dynasty over the western khanates. However, this supremacy was based on nothing like the same foundations as that of the earlier khagans. Conflicts such as border clashes among them continued; for example, the Esen Buqa–Ayurbarwada war occurred between the Chagatai Khanate and the Ilkhanate in the 1310s. The four khanates continued to function as separate states and fell at different times.

=== Yuan dynasty ===
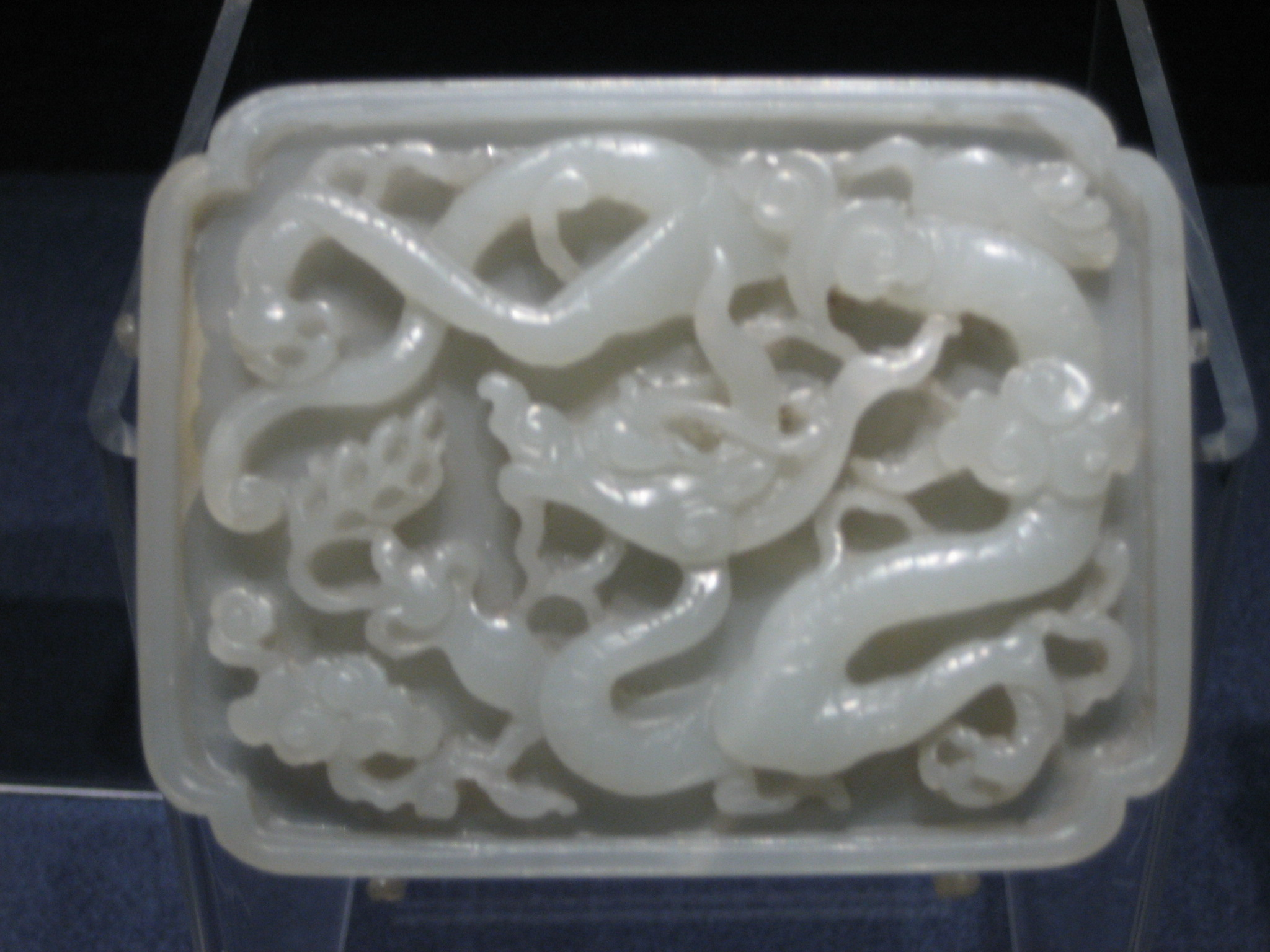
A Yuan dynasty jade belt plaque featuring carved designs of a dragon.

The transition of the capital of the Mongol Empire from Karakorum to Khanbaliq (Dadu, modern-day Beijing) by Kublai in 1264 was opposed by many conservative Mongols. Thus, Ariq Böke's struggle was for keeping the center of the empire in the traditional Mongol homeland of Outer Mongolia. After Ariq Böke's death, the struggle was continued by Kaidu, a grandson of Ogedei Khan and lord Nayan.

By eliminating the Song dynasty in 1279, Kublai completed the conquest of China proper. The fleets of the Yuan dynasty attempted to invade Japan in 1274 and 1281, but both invasions failed, and a large number of their ships were destroyed in sea storms called kamikazes (divine wind) on both occasions. The ordinary people experienced hardships during the Yuan dynasty. Hence, Mongol warriors rebelled against Kublai in 1289. Kublai died in 1294 and was succeeded by Temür (Emperor Chengzong), who continued the fight against Kaidu, which lasted until Kaidu's death in 1301. Ayurbarwada Buyantu Khan came to power in 1312. The civil service examination system was instituted in the Yuan dynasty in 1313.

A rebellion called the Red Turban Rebellion began in the 1350s and the Yuan dynasty was overthrown by the Ming dynasty in 1368. The last Yuan emperor, Toghon Temür (Emperor Huizong), fled north to Yingchang and died there in 1370. The Yuan remnants, which had retreated to the Mongolian Plateau, are known in historiography as the Northern Yuan dynasty and continued to resist the Ming dynasty until it was conquered by the Jurchen-led Later Jin dynasty (predecessor of the Qing dynasty) in 1635.

=== Golden Horde ===
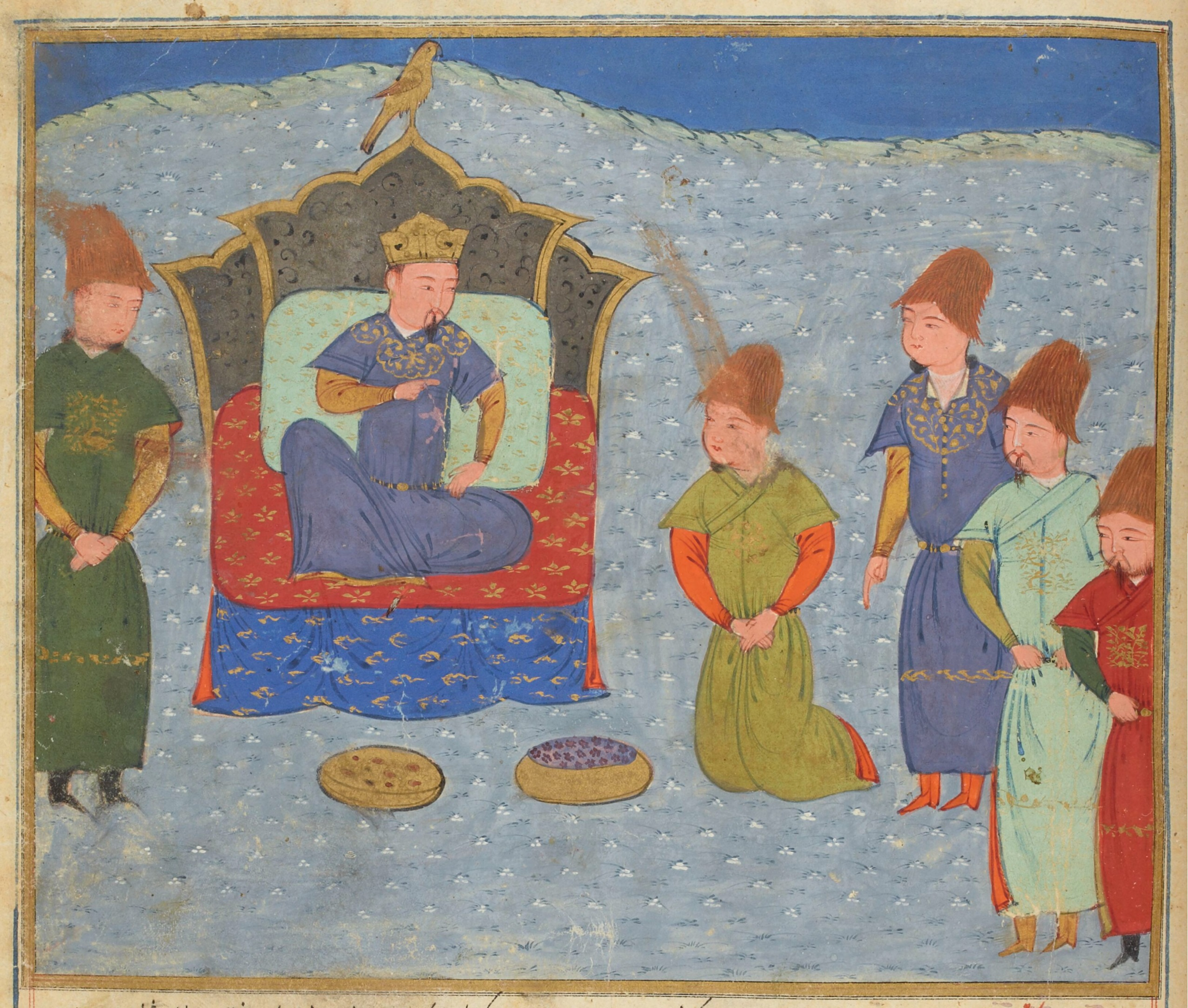
Batu Khan establishes the Golden Horde.

The Golden Horde was founded by Batu, son of Jochi, in 1243. The Golden Horde included the Volga region, the Ural Mountains, the steppes of the northern Black Sea, the North Caucasus, western Siberia, the Aral Sea and Irtysh basin, and held the Russian principalities in tributary relations.

The capital was initially Sarai Batu and later Sarai Berke. This extensive empire weakened under rivalry of the descendants of Batu and split into the Kazakh Khanate, the Khanate of Kazan, the Astrakhan Khanate, the Crimean Khanate, the Khanate of Sibir, the Great Horde, the Nogai Horde, and the White Horde during the 15th century. A unified Russia later conquered Kazan in 1552, the Astrakhan Khanate in 1556, the Khanate of Sibir in 1598, and the Crimean Khanate in 1783.

=== Chagatai Khanate ===
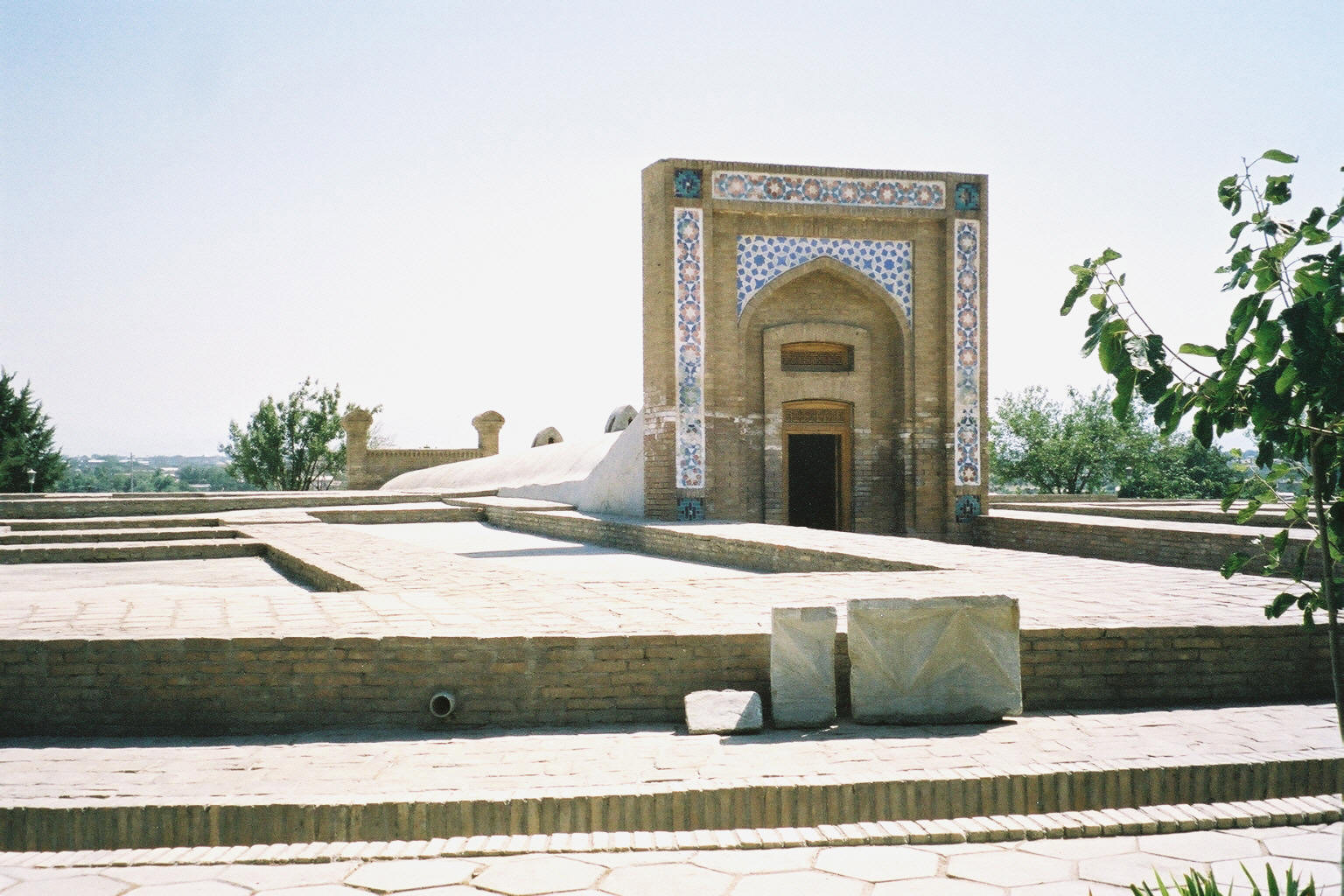
Ulugh Beg Observatory in Samarkand

The Chagatai Khanate separated in 1266 and covered Central Asia, Lake Balkhash, Kashgaria, Afghanistan, and Zhetysu. It was split between settled Transoxania (Ma Wara'un-Nahr) in the west and nomadic Moghulistan in the east.

Initially, the rulers of the Chagatai Khanate recognized the supremacy of the Great Khan, but by the reign of Kublai Khan, Ghiyas-ud-din Baraq no longer obeyed orders from the east. From 1363, the Chagatais progressively lost Transoxiana to the Timurids. The reduced, Moghulistan, lasted until the late 15th century, when it broke off into the Yarkent Khanate and the Turpan Khanate. In 1680, the remaining Chagatai domains lost their independence to the Dzungar Khanate, and in 1705, the last Chagatai khan was removed from power, ending the dynasty.

=== Ilkhanate ===
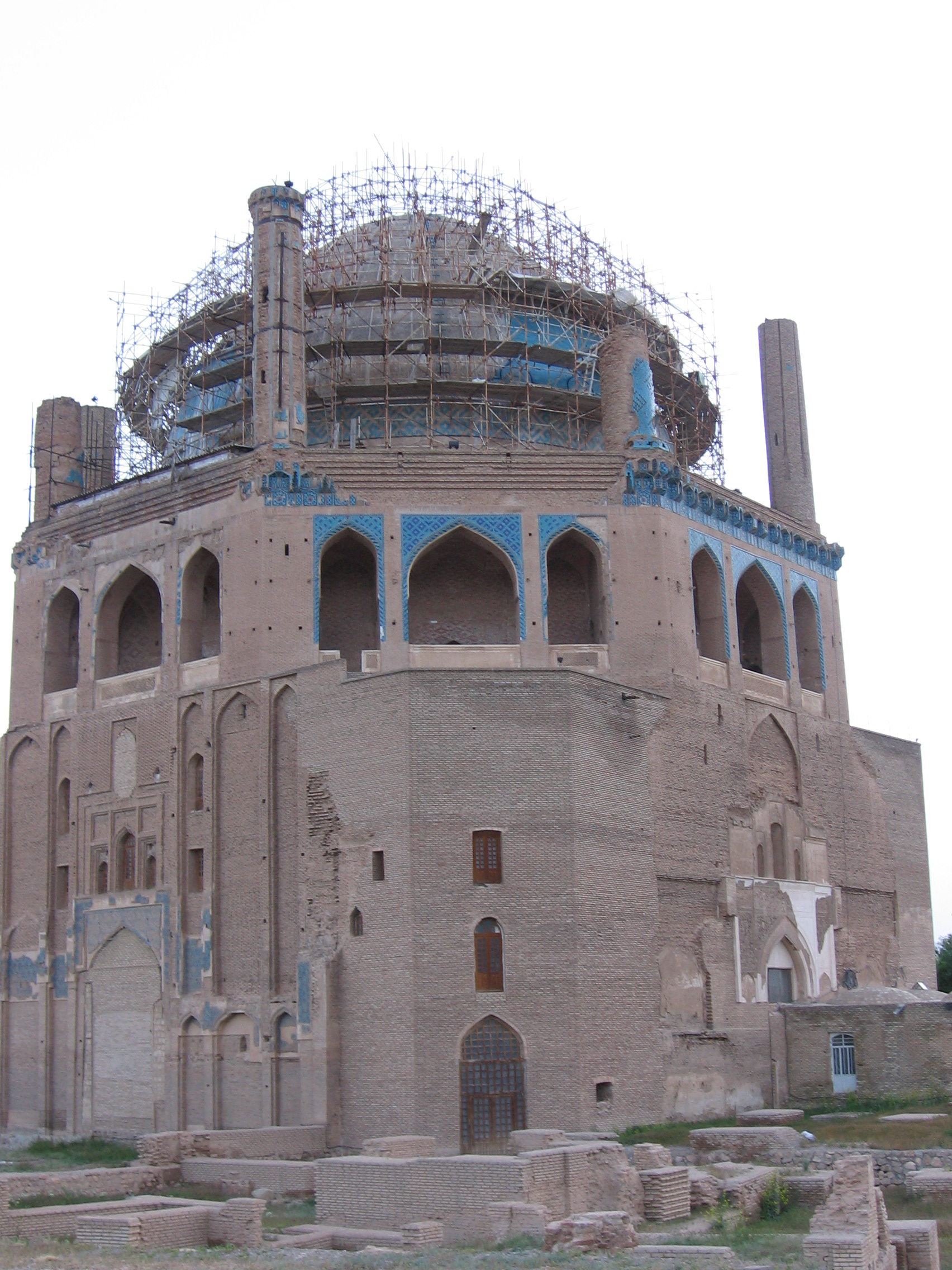
Dome of Soltaniyeh

The Ilkhanate, ruled by the Toluid House of Hulagu, formed in 1256 and comprised Iran, Iraq, Transcaucasus, eastern Asia Minor, and western Turkestan. While the early rulers of the khanate increasingly adopted Tibetan Buddhism, the Mongol rulers converted to Islam after the enthronement of Ilkhan Ghazan (1295–1304). In 1300, Rashid-al-Din Hamadani in cooperation with Mongol historians commenced writing Jami al-Tawarikh (Sudur un Chigulgan, Compendium of Chronicles) under Ghazan's order. The work was completed in 1311 during the reign of Ilkhan Öljeitü (1304–1316). Altan Debter, written by Mongol historian Bolad Chinsan, served as a basis for writing Jami al-Tawarikh. After the death of Abu Sa'id (1316–1335) the Ilkhanate disintegrated rapidly into several states. The most prominent one was the Jalayrid dynasty, ruled by descendants of Mukhali of Jalair.

== See also ==
- 16 Great Turkic Empires
- Mongol Empire
- Toluid Civil War
- Berke–Hulegu war
- Kaidu–Kublai war
- Esen Buqa–Ayurbarwada war
- Inner Asia
- List of Mongol states
- Mongol invasions and conquests
- Tartary
- Turanism
- Turco-Mongol tradition
- Turco-Persian tradition
- Turkic peoples
- Turkification
- Yuan dynasty in Inner Asia
