= Sack of Bukhara (1273) =

- Part of the Kaidu–Kublai war
Date	29 January 1273 (1 week)
Location	Bukhara, Transoxania (present-day Uzbekistan)
Result	Ilkhanate victory
Territorial changes	Bukhara destroyed; Ilkhanids withdraw beyond the Oxus

Belligerents
Ilkhanate	Chagatai Khanate

Commanders and leaders
Abaqa Khan	Ghiyas-ud-din Baraq

Casualties and losses
Unknown	City destroyed; Massive emigration

The Sack of Bukhara was a military action that happened on January 1273 carried out by the forces of the Ilkhanate against the city of Bukhara. The attack was ordered by the Ilkhanid ruler Abaqa Khan amid the power struggles among the Mongol successor khanates following the fragmentation of the Mongol Empire.

== Background ==
After the defeat of Barak at Herat it marked the collapse of his reign. He then retreated to Bukhara, where he was struck by paralysis and had to be borne in a litter. His army started breaking up, as some of the commanders defected to Abaqa, while two of the princes tried to escape east. Baraq sent faithful followers after them and sent his brother, Basar, to request Kaidu's assistance, attributing his defeat to Qipchaq and Chabat's desertion. But Kaidu imprisoned Basar but promised Baraq that he would send an army.

In place of this, Kaidu marched 20,000 men west to take advantage of Chagataid weakness and to forestall Baraq from obtaining the assistance of Kublai Khan. By the time Baraq had received news of Kaidu's advance, his own men had taken captive the fugitive princes. Baraq sought to deter Kaidu, but soon his camp was encircled. On the following morning, Baraq was dead, and the majority of his 30,000 men surrendered to Kaidu, who granted them pasturelands and portions of his treasury. Baraq died in August 1271, and within a month, Kaidu was crowned khan at Talas.

== Sack ==
The Ilkhanid force arrived at Bukhara on January 29, 1273. The operation was reportedly conducted as retribution for the damage inflicted upon Khurāsān by Baraq's earlier campaign. Upon their arrival, they offered to allow the inhabitants to follow them to Khorasan with their property. When they refused the offer the Mongols entered the city, the Ilkhanid troops found no Chaghadaid or Ögödeid troops. Despite the absence of any opposing forces, Abaqa's army carried out the destruction of the city. For a period of one week, they burned and pillaged Bukhara, reducing it to ashes. In the final stage of the sack, the sons of Alghu appeared. They avoided engaging the departing Ilkhanid forces, but seized part of the human booty and carried out further plundering themselves.

== Aftermath ==
After plundering the city for a week they eventually left, leaving Bukhara destroyed. The Oxus continued to be the Ilkhanids' eastern frontier, and they made no attempt to extend beyond it despite their triumph. Abaqa's triumph placed Ilkhanid control on Khorasan, providing stability along his eastern border for the rest of his reign. Although later the Ilkhanids experienced raids by the Kaidu, Chagataids, and the Qara'unas in Khorasan and Herat, the Iranian eastern frontier remained relatively stable until Timur's rise.
