= Orghana =

Oirat princess

Orghana (Orakina or Ergene Khatun) was an Oirat princess of the Mongol Empire and Empress of the Chagatai Khanate. She was a daughter of Torolchi, chief of the Oirats and Checheyikhen, daughter of Genghis Khan. She served as regent in the name of her infant son from 1252 to 1261.

She married Qara Hülëgü, a grandson of Chagatai Khan. Her husband was enthroned as Chagatayid Khan in 1242 after deaths of both Ögedei and Chagatai. However, Güyük Khan replaced Qara Hülëgü with his uncle Yesü Möngke in 1246.

When the Toluid family overthrew the Ögedeids, Qara Hülëgü supported Möngke Khan in 1251. Möngke reappointed Qara Hülëgü khan of the Chagatai Khanate and executed Yesü Möngke. However, he died on the way and Möngke permitted his widow Orghana to serve as regent in the name of her infant son. She ruled the Khanate for nine years (1252 to 1261). According to Rashid al-Din, she organized a banquet for Hulagu when his army was marching through Central Asia to Iran in 1255.

In 1260, the Toluid Civil War broke out in the Mongol Empire with the death of Möngke, and his brother Ariq Böke dispatched Alghu to Beshbalik to consolidate his power. Alghu removed Orghana from power whereupon she fled to Mongolia. Taking advantage of the struggle between Ariq Böke and the older brother Kublai, Alghu acted as an autonomous khan who sided with Kublai and killed Ariq Böke's officials. After several battles, Ariq Böke sent Masud Beg and Orghana to Alghu to negotiate peace.

Alghu married Orghana, and appointed Masud viceroy in Central Asia. After the death of Alghu in 1266, Orghana nominated her son Mubarak Shah by her first husband, Qara Hülëgü as khan of the Chagatai Khanate. The Great Khan Kublai was furious at this and sent Baraq to take power in the Chagatai Khanate. After a few months, he usurped the throne from Mubarak Shah with the assistance of the Mongol noblemen. Orghana had apparently died by that time.
