= Berke–Hulegu war =

War between the Golden Horde and Ilkhanate

- Part of the Toluid Civil War, the division of the Mongol Empire and the Golden Horde–Ilkhanate war
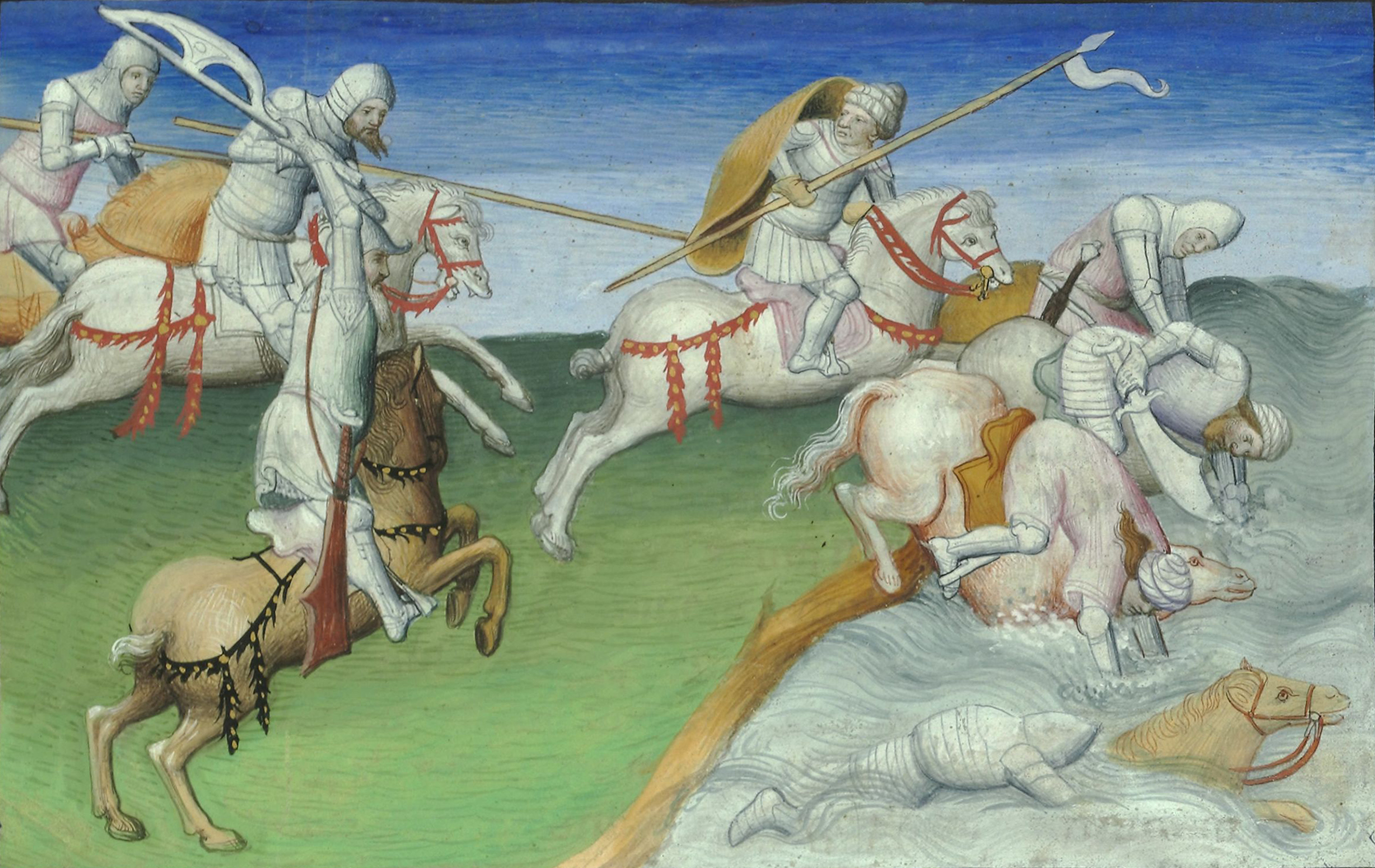
- Hulegu chases Berke (1262).Hayton of Corycus, Fleur des histoires d'orient.
Date	1262-1263; 1265-1266
Location	Caucasus Mountains, eastern Khorasan
Result	Inconclusive: Berke’s invasions repelled
Territorial changes	Fragmentation of the empire

Belligerents
Ilkhanate	Golden Horde

Commanders and leaders
Hulegu Khan; Abaqa Khan; Yoshmut; Elgäi Noyan; Samagar; Kutu-Buqa †	Berke Khan #; Nogai Khan (WIA); Boroldai †; Negudar (AWOL)

Strength
70,000-120,000-170,000	30,000 vanguard 300,000+ (likely exaggerated)

Casualties and losses
Heavy	Heavy

The Berke–Hulegu war was fought between two Mongol leaders, Berke Khan of the Golden Horde and Hulegu Khan of the Ilkhanate. It was fought mostly in the Caucasus Mountains area in the 1260s after the destruction of Baghdad in 1258. The war overlaps with the Toluid Civil War in the Mongol Empire between two members of the Tolui family line, Kublai Khan and Ariq Böke, who both claimed the title of Great Khan (Khagan). Kublai allied with Hulegu, while Ariq Böke sided with Berke. Hulegu headed to Mongolia for the election of a new Khagan to succeed Möngke Khan, but the loss of the Battle of Ain Jalut to the Mamluks forced him to withdraw back to the Middle East. The Mamluk victory emboldened Berke to invade the Ilkhanate. The Berke–Hulegu war and the Toluid Civil War as well as the subsequent Kaidu–Kublai war marked a key moment in the fragmentation of the Mongol empire after the death of Möngke, the fourth khan of the Mongol Empire.

== Background ==
In 1252, Berke converted to Islam, and in 1257 he assumed power in the Golden Horde after the death of Ulaghchi. Like his brother Batu, he was loyal to the Great Khan Möngke. Although aware of Berke's conversion to Islam, Hulegu, after conquering Persia, destroyed Baghdad in 1258, added Mesopotamia to the Mongol Empire, advanced towards the Levant and Mamluk Sultanate, and began a war of attrition against the Mamluk Sultanate. Berke became enraged with Hulegu's rampage through Muslim lands, and as a preparatory step, directed his nephew Nogai Khan to raid Poland in 1259 in order to collect booty to finance a war. Several Polish cities were plundered, including Kraków and Sandomierz. Berke then struck an alliance with the Mamluk Sultan Qutuz and later Sultan Baibars of Egypt.

That same year, Mongke died in a military campaign in China. Muslim historian Rashid al Din quoted Berke Khan as sending the following message to Mongke Khan, protesting the attack on Baghdad, (not knowing Mongke had died in China).

"He (Hulegu) has sacked all the cities of the Muslims. With the help of Allah I will call him to account for so much innocent blood."

Even though Berke was Muslim, he was at first resistant to the idea of fighting Hulegu out of Mongol brotherhood; he said

"Mongols are killed by Mongol swords. If we were united, then we would have conquered all of the world."

However, the Ilkhanids had hoarded the wealth of North Iran and demanded the Golden Horde cease selling slaves to the Mamluks; the economic damage to the Golden Horde from the actions of the Ilkhanate led him to declare jihad.

== War ==
=== First phase ===
Early in 1262, Berke Khan dispatched Nogai with 30,000 men as his vanguard, while he followed with the main army. Advancing past Derbent, they encamped outside Shirvan. Hulegu Khan sent word to his dispersed forces across Iran to proceed and set out with his main force in August. In mid-October, Berke's troops defeated Hulegu’s vanguard, commanded by Shirämün Noyan, near Shamakhi. On November 15, The Ilkhanate General Abatai Noyan arrived, attacked, and defeated Berke's army around Shabaran, killing many of them. Nogai fled. Pressing the advance, Hulegu and his men continued to pursue Berke and Nogai and, on the early morning of Friday, December 7, arrived at Derbent, where some of the enemy troops appeared on the walls but were driven away by arrows, the place was then stormed and taken. On the other side, a battle took place which ended in a heavy defeat for Berke, who, with his army unable to withstand the onslaught, took flight. They were pursued and the slaughter continued until the end of Saturday. A week later, on December 15, Nogai, perhaps attempting to slow down Hulegu, yet again suffered a crushing defeat and continued to flee. The victorious Ilkhanate forces continued their pursuit and crossed the Terek River, capturing their tents. When Berke and his soldiers learned of this, they turned back and attacked the disorganized Ilkhanate army. On January 13, 1263, a fierce battle raged on the banks of the Terek River from dawn until nightfall. As Berke’s reinforcements kept pouring in, the Ilkhanate army turned in flight. While crossing the frozen river, the ice cracked under their weight, and many soldiers drowned. Berke and his army then withdrew to Derbent.

=== Second phase ===
Just one month after Abaqa Khan’s enthronement following the death of Hulegu, Nogai set out with a large army through Derbent. Scouts reported his movements, and the Ilkhanid prince Yoshmut marched out to confront him. The armies met at the Aksu River, or Agsu, north of Shirvan, and a fierce battle began. Many men were killed on both sides, with Qutu Buqa, Taghachar’s father fighting bravely before being killed. Nogai as well took an arrow to the eye; his army was defeated and withdrew to Shirvan. Abaqa Khan crossed the Kura River while Berke Khan arrived with a huge force, which Rashid al-Din describes as “300,000 cavalry.” Abaqa then recrossed the river and destroyed the bridges. For fourteen days Berke stayed on the river’s edge, and arrows were shot from both sides. Berke then marched toward Tbilisi in order to find a crossing there, but he fell ill and died along the way. His body was taken to Sarai while his army dispersed, thus ending the Berke–Hulegu War.

Hulegu was loyal to his brother Kublai, but clashes with their cousin Berke, the ruler of the Golden Horde in the northwestern part of the Empire, began in 1262. The suspicious deaths of Jochid princes in Hulegu's service, unequal distribution of war booties and Hulegu's massacres of the Muslims increased the anger of Berke, who considered supporting a rebellion of the Georgian Kingdom against Hulegu's rule in 1259–1260. Berke also forged an alliance with the Egyptian Mamluks against Hulegu, and supported Kublai's rival claimant, Ariq Böke.

Kublai dispatched an army under Abaqa to attack the Golden Horde, while Ariq Böke sent Nogai to invade the Ilkhanate; both sides suffered disastrous defeats. Hulegu marched northwards through the Pass of Derbent against Berke. On the banks of the Terek, he was ambushed by an army of the Golden Horde under Nogai, and his army was defeated at the Battle of the Terek River in 1262, with many thousands being cut down or drowning when the ice of the river gave way. Hulegu subsequently retreated back into Azerbaijan.

Ariq Böke surrendered to Kublai at Shangdu on August 21, 1264. The rulers of the Golden Horde and Chagatai Khanate subsequently acknowledged the reality of Kublai's victory and rule, after which Kublai began preparations for his conquest of the Song dynasty.

When the Byzantine Empire, the ally of the Ilkhanate, captured Egyptian envoys, Berke sent an army through his vassal Bulgaria, prompting the release of the envoys and the Seljuq Sultan Kaykaus II. He tried to raise civil unrest in Anatolia using Kaykaus but failed. In the new official version of the family history, Kublai Khan refused to write Berke's name as the khan of Golden Horde for his support to Ariq Böke and wars with Hulegu. However, Jochi's descendants were fully recognized as legitimate family members.

Kublai Khan also reinforced Hulegu with 30,000 young Mongols in order to stabilize the political situation in the western khanates. As soon as Hulegu died on February 8, 1265, Berke marched to cross the Terek near Tiflis, but died on the way. Within a few months of these deaths, Alghu Khan of the Chagatai Khanate died, too. This sudden vacuum of power somewhat relieved Kublai's control over the western khanates.

== Aftermath ==
This was the second open war between Mongols, shortly after the beginning of the Toluid Civil War between Kublai Khan and Ariq Böke. Before that, there had been tensions between Batu and Güyük that could have erupted into an open war, but the sudden death of the latter had averted hostilities. Together with the war between Kublai Khan and Ariq Böke, Berke and Hulegu set a precedent which was repeated in the form of further wars between Mongol khanates and even inside the khanates, such as the conflicts between Abaqa and Baraq in 1270, Kaidu and Kublai Khan in the 1270s and 1280s, Toqta and Nogai in the late 1290s, and the war between Duwa and Chapar in the early 14th century. This war, along with the second raid against Poland, also marked the rise of Nogai Khan within the Golden Horde. After Berke's death, Nogai became ever more powerful, and turned into a kingmaker in the Golden Horde despite never officially ruling the empire.

== See also ==
- Division of the Mongol Empire
