= Ebuskun =

Ebuskun served as regent for the Chagatai Khanate from 1242 until 1246 during the minority of her son Qara Hülëgü.

She was the spouse of Mö'etüken, the eldest son of Chagatai Khan and grandson of Genghis Khan. She became a widow in 1221 when Mö'etüken died during the Siege of Bamyan in 1221.

When her father-in-law Chagatai died in 1242, her son inherited the throne. Since he was a minor, she became his regent, a role she fulfilled for four years.

She lost power when the new grand khan Güyük Khan replaced her son Qara Hülëgü with Yesü Möngke. Within two years, however, Güyük died, and Mongke restored Hülëgü and Ebuskun to their former positions. Shortly afterwards, Hülëgü also died; after this point, Ebuskun is no longer mentioned. Hülëgü's throne was passed to his wife, Organah Khatun.
