= Esen Buqa–Ayurbarwada war =

Military conflict

Date	1314–1318
Location	China, Mongolia, Central Asia, Western Asia
Result	Yuan and Ilkhanate victory

Belligerents
Chagatai Khanate	Yuan dynasty Ilkhanate

Commanders and leaders
Esen Buqa I Kebek	Ayurbarwada Buyantu Khan; Öljaitü

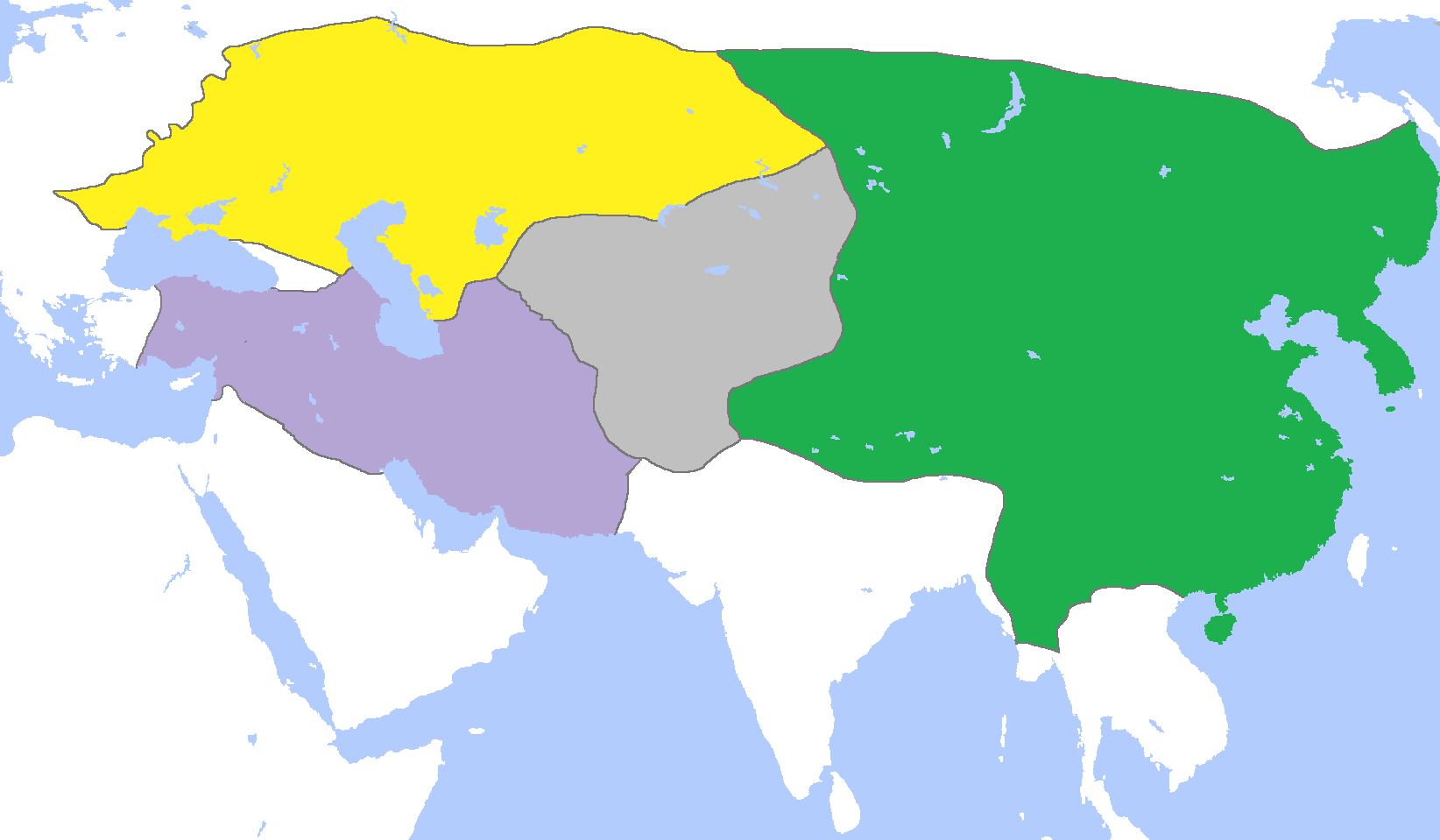
The division of the Mongol Empire, c. 1300, with Yuan dynasty in green, Golden Horde in yellow, Chagatai Khanate in gray, and Ilkhanate in purple.

The Esen Buqa–Ayurbarwada war was a war between the Chagatai Khanate under Esen Buqa I and the Yuan dynasty under Ayurbarwada Buyantu Khan (Emperor Renzong) and its ally the Ilkhanate under Öljaitü. The war ended with the victory for the Yuan and the Ilkhanate, but the peace only came after the death of Esen Buqa in 1318.

== Background ==
The Yuan emperor Ayurbarwarda maintained friendly relations with Öljaitü, ruler of the Ilkhanate. As for the relations with the Chagatai Khanate, the Yuan forces had, in fact, already for a long time been entrenched in the east. This was originally meant to keep Chapar in submission, but since the latter's defeat in 1310, the garrisons were perceived as a threat to the Chaghadaid state. In order to solve the shortages of pasture grounds, Esen Buqa I, ruler of the Chagatai Khanate sent envoys in an attempt to negotiate with the border garrison commander Tughaji Jinsank in order to convince them to adjust their position in 1312. The negotiations, however, did not go well, and strained relations between the two. Esen Buqa sent tributes to Ayurbarwada in 1312 and 1313, but the Yuan court's attempts to restrict trade between the two states kept tensions high. Ayurbarwada's emissary, Abishqa, to the Ilkhanate while travelling through Central Asia, revealed to a Chaghadayid commander that an alliance between the Yuan and the Ilkhanate had been created, and the allies forces were mobilizing to attack the khanate. Esen Buqa ordered Abishqa to be executed and decided to attack the Yuan because of these events, thus breaking the peace that his father Duwa had brokered with Yuan in 1304.

At the same time, Muslim Ozbeg Khan mounted the throne of the Golden Horde in 1312. He proscribed Buddhism and Shamanism among the Mongols in Russia, reversing the spread of the Yuan culture. Yuan envoys seems to have backed Toqta's son, a rival candidate, against Ozbeg. Esen Buqa attempted to gain an alliance of Ozbeg Khan against the Yuan and the Ilkhanate, but without success.

== War ==
The element of surprise, however, was lost when a Chaghadaid official defected to Tughaji's camp and revealed the plan. Tughaji withdrew his troops to beyond the Irtysh, then defeated Esen Buqa's troops in the spring of 1314. The magnitude of the defeat was such that Esen Buqa sought peace, claiming to the Yuan court that Tughaji had moved to attack first. Chunqur, a son of Tughaji, convinced the Chagatai khan that none of the Yuan troops besides Tughaji's would move against him if he attacked again. Tughaji, however, again kept Esen Buqa's troops from victory. The Yuan Emperor Ayurbarwada, growing impatient with Esen Buqa, ordered all of the garrisons to invade the Chagatai realm. Hami was conquered soon afterwards.

After his failure, Esen Buqa warned Ozbeg Khan that the Yuan emperor Ayurbarwada would replace him with another from the House of Jochi in 1315. This testimony was never corroborated with any evidence. Ozbeg was suggested not to believe it by one of his vizirs and he therefore refused to help Esen Buqa.

In an attempt to make up for some of his losses, Esen Buqa dispatched his brother Kebek with a large force to attack Khorasan, a part of the Ilkhanate, sometime after 1315. Before that, the Ilkhan Öljaitü drove out the Qaraunas of Dawud Khoja, son of Qutlugh Khwaja from Afghanistan. The invasion of the Ilkhanate was initially successful. Kebek and Yasa'ur defeated Öljaitü's army at the Murgab River and advanced to Herat. But it turned sour when news reached the army that Talas and the pasture of Issyk Kül had been captured by Yuan forces under the Kipchak commander Chongur. Many of the Chaghadaid troops' families had been located there, and, already tired of campaigning, they fled back home. The defection of a Yuan contender, Khutughtu, to Esen Buqa's side did little to improve the situation. Around this time Yasa'ur defected to Öljeitü and engaged in battle with Kebek's troops. The Yuan army crushed Esen Buqa's resistance and plundered his winter quarters on the Issyk Kul as well as his summer residence in Talas. The disaster was completed when prince Tore Temür deserted to the Yuan.

Only after Esen Buqa's death in 1318, his brother and successor Kebek mitigated the situation with the Yuan and the Ilkhanate. He enjoyed peaceful relations with the Yuan despite Ayurbarwada's reestablishment of nominal authority in Turfanistan. This allowed peace to prosper again in the region.

== See also ==
- Kaidu–Kublai war
- Division of the Mongol Empire
