= Mubarak Shah (Chagatai Khan) =

- Khan
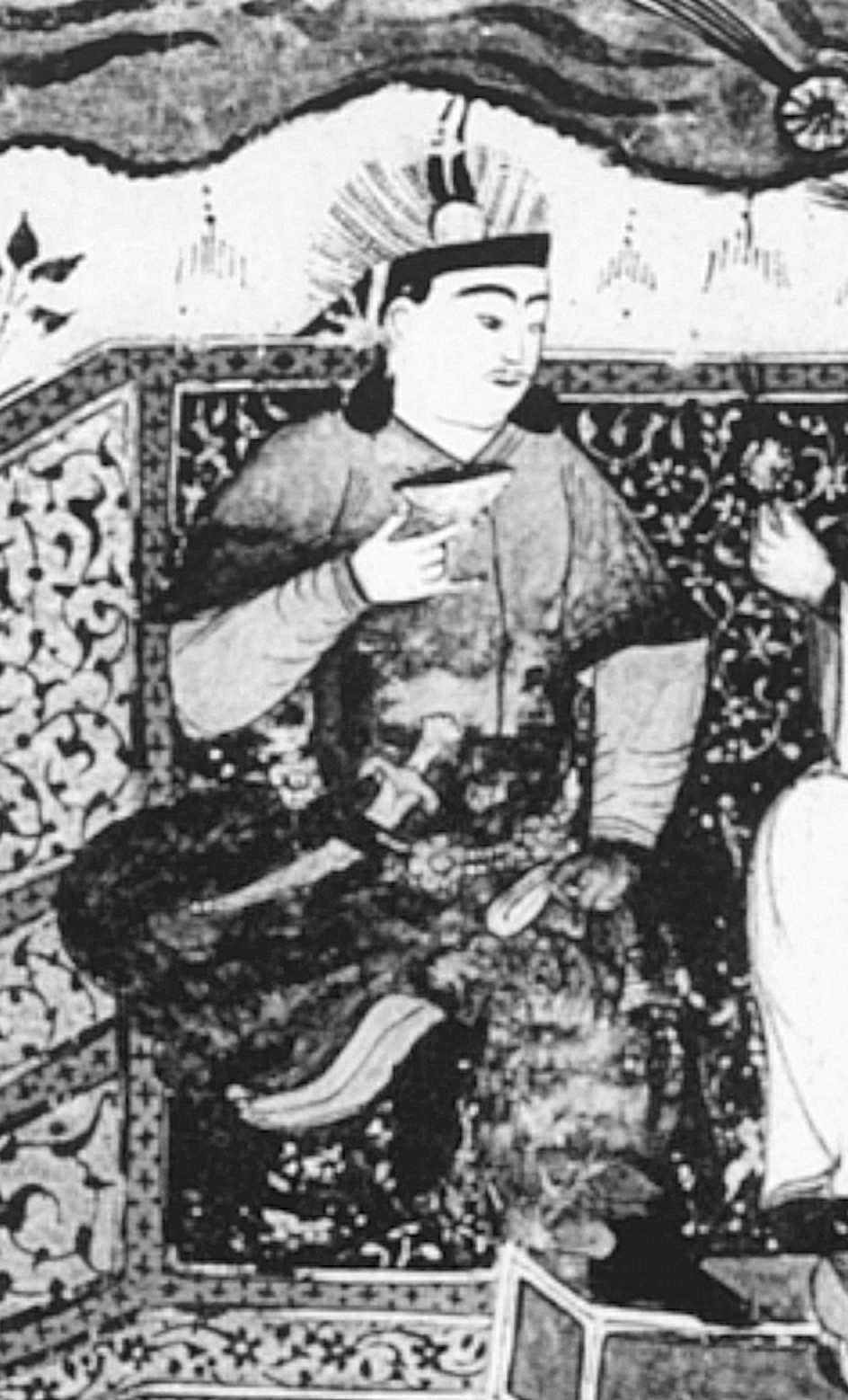
- Likely portrait of Mubarak Shah, enthroned. Jami al-Tawarikh, late 14th century (Asiatic Society, D.31)

Khan of the Chagatai Khanate
- 1st reign: 1252 – 1260
- Predecessor: Qara Hülegü
- Successor: Alghu
- Regent: Orghana
- Vizier: Qarachar
- 2nd Reign: March 1266 – September 1266
- Predecessor: Alghu
- Successor: Ghiyas-ud-din Baraq
- Born: Chagatai Khanate
- Died: 1276; Chagatai Khanate
- House: Borjigid Dynasty
- Father: Qara Hülegü
- Mother: Ergene Khatun

Mubarak Shah (Chagatai and Persian: مبارک شاه) was Khan of the Chagatai Khanate (1252–1260; March–September 1266) he was the son and successor of Qara Hülegü.

== Biography ==
He was the son of Qara Hülëgü (son of Mötüken) and the Oirat princess Ergene Khatun (daughter of Toralji Küregen). He was the first Chagatai Khan to convert to Islam. Upon the death of his father in 1252, Mubarak Shah succeeded him as Chagatai Khan, with his mother Orghana acting as regent. In 1260, however, the Great Khan claimant Ariq Böke appointed Chagatai Khan's grandson Alghu, and by the following year Alghu had control over much of the Khanate. When Alghu revolted against Ariq Böke in 1262, Orghana supported him. After Alghu died in 1266, Ergene enthroned Mubarak Shah as head of the ulus again, without the permission of Kublai Khan, who was also proclaimed the Great Khan and defeated Ariq Böke 2 years after. Kublai Khan, however, supported Baraq, a great-grandson of Chagatai as his co-ruler. Baraq gained the loyalty of Mubarak Shah's army and soon moved against him, exiling him that year. Later, Mubarak Shah supported Kaidu against Baraq in 1271, but soon felt compelled to defect to another enemy of Kaidu, the Ilkhan Abaqa.

Abaqa Khan appointed him a chief of the Qaraunas. He died of natural causes while ravaging south-east Persian regions in 1276.

== Family ==
He had several wives and concubines with whom he had five sons:

1. Öljei Buqa
  - Qutluqshah
2. Boralqi
  - Tutluq
3. Horqadai
4. Esen Pulad
5. Qadaq

Preceded by Qara Hülegü	Khan of Chagatai Khanate; First Reign; 1251 - 1260	Succeeded by Alghu
Preceded by Alghu	Khan of Chagatai Khanate; Second Reign; 1266	Succeeded by Ghiyas-ud-din Baraq
