= Qara Hülegü =

Khan of the Chagatai Khanate
- 1st reign: 1242–1246
- Predecessor: Chagatai Khan
- Successor: Yesü Möngke
- 2nd reign: 1252
- Predecessor: Yesü Möngke
- Successor: Mubarak Shah
- Vizier: Qarachar
- Died: 1252
- Spouse: Orghana
- House: Borjigin
- Father: Mutukan
- Mother: Ebuskun

Qara Hülegü (died 1252) was head of the ulus of the Chagatai Khanate (1242–1246, 1252).

He was the son of Mutukan (killed during the siege of Bamyan), who was the favored son of Chagatai Khan. He was nominated by Chagatai Khan, as well as Ögedei Khan, to become khan. Since he was still young, his mother Ebuskun acted as regent for him. In order to ensure his power, however, the Grand Khan Güyük Khan deposed him in 1246 and replaced him with one of Qara Hülegü's uncles, Yesü Möngke.

However, following the ascension of Güyük's successor, Möngke Khan, Qara Hülegü gained the Great Khan's favor by supporting him in his purges of the family of Ögedei. He was restored to his position of Chagatai Khan, but died before returning to his realm. Mongke permitted his wife Orghana Khatun (daughter of Toralchi Küregen, granddaughter of Qutuqa Beki) to serve as regent. Qara Hülegü was later succeeded by his son Mubarak Shah.

Preceded by Chagatai Khan	Khan of Chagatai Khanate; First Reign; 1242–1246	Succeeded by Yesü Möngke
Preceded by Yesü Möngke	Khan of Chagatai Khanate; Second Reign; 1252	Succeeded by Mubarak Shah (under the regency of Orghana)
