= Yesü Möngke =

Khan of the Chagatai Khanate
- Reign: 1246–1252
- Predecessor: Qara Hülegü
- Successor: Qara Hülegü
- Vizier: Qarachar; Baha al-Din Marghinani
- Born: Turkestan
- Died: 1252 Khani Chahar Bagh
- Spouse: Naishi Khatun
- House: Borjigin
- Father: Chagatai Khan
- Mother: Yesülün Khatun

Yesü Möngke (Mongolian: Есөнмөнх, died 1252) was head of the ulus of the Chagatai Khanate from 1246 to 1252.

== Biography ==
He was the fifth son of Chagatai Khan and Yesülün Khatun. In or around 1246, he was appointed as khan of the Chagatai Khanate by his cousin the Great Khan Güyük Khan, whom he was friends with, following the deposition of Qara Hülëgü. The next Great Khan, however, Möngke Khan, initiated a purge of the supporters of the house of Ögedei Khan, amongst which were the Chaghadaids. Yesü Möngke was executed by Orghana after his dismissal. Qara Hülëgü was then restored to his former position.

He had a wife called Naishi (or Toqashi), but they had no children. He was reported to be often drunk, so that his wife and vizier Baha al-Din Marghinani ruled in his stead.

Preceded by Qara Hülëgü	Khan of Chagatai Khanate; 1246−1252	Succeeded by Qara Hülëgü
