= Kaidu–Kublai war =

1268–1301 civil war in the Mongol Empire

- Part of the division of the Mongol Empire
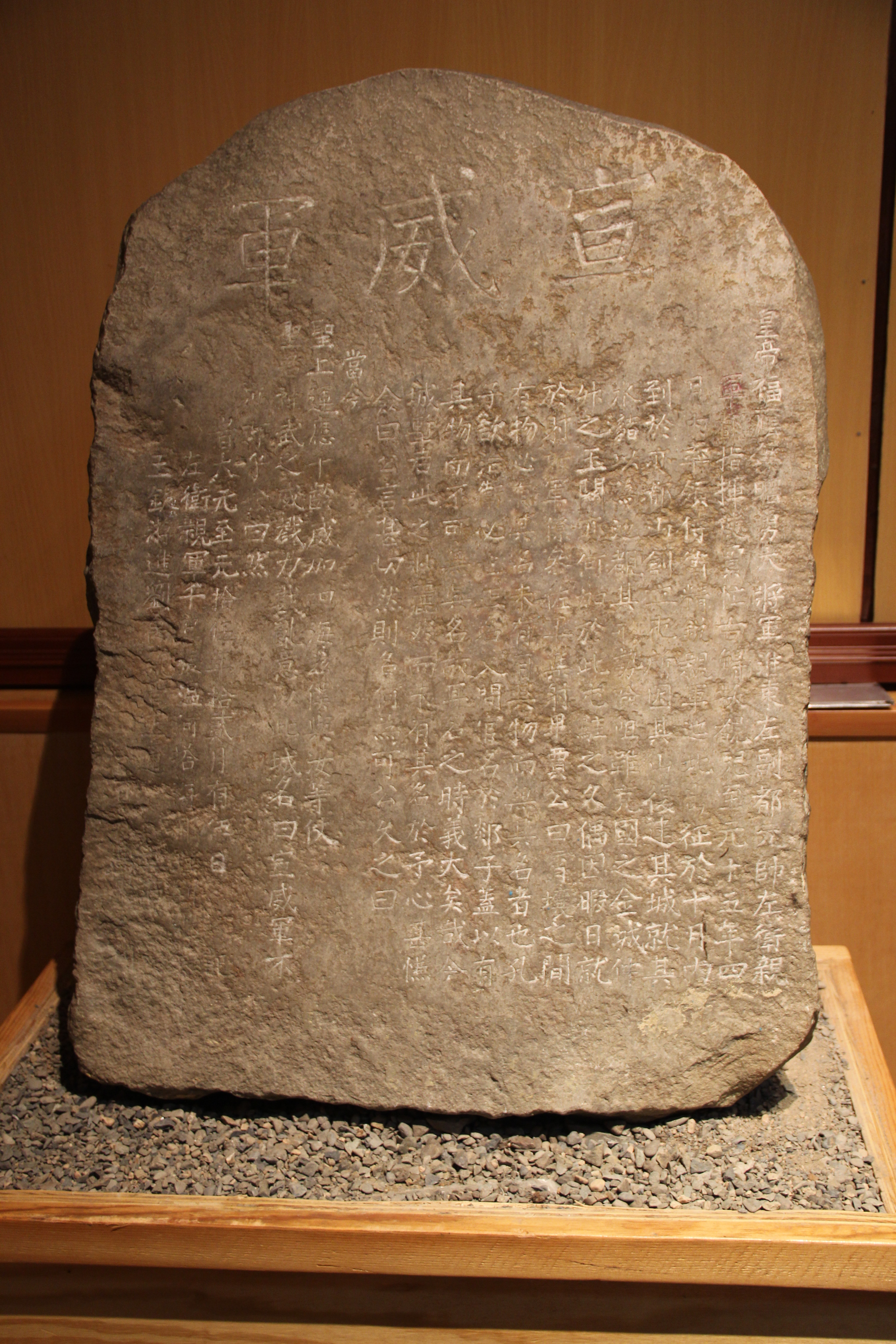
- The monument in "Xuanwei Army" city recorded the suppression of the rebellion in Lingbei Province
Date	1268–1301
Location	Central Asia; East Asia; West Asia
Result	Inconclusive

Belligerents
Chagatai Khanate; House of Ögedei; Golden Horde (until 1284)	Mongol Empire (1268–1270); Yuan dynasty (1271–1301); Ilkhanate; Golden Horde (1284 after)

Commanders and leaders
Kaidu †; Baraq †; Duwa; Mengu-Timur	Kublai Khan; Temür Khan; Abagha; Toqta; Bayan

Kaidu, the leader of the Mongol House of Ögedei, fought a war against Kublai Khan and his successor Temür from 1268 to 1301. Kaidu was the de facto khan of the Chagatai Khanate, while Kublai was the founder of the Yuan dynasty. The Kaidu–Kublai war followed the Toluid Civil War (1260–1264) and resulted in the permanent division of the Mongol Empire. By the time of Kublai's death in 1294, the Mongol Empire had fractured into four separate polities: the Golden Horde khanate in the northwest, the Chagatai Khanate in the middle, the Ilkhanate in the southwest, and the Yuan dynasty in the east based in modern-day Beijing. Although Temür later made peace with the three western khanates in 1304 after Kaidu's death, the four successor states of the Mongol Empire continued their own separate development and fell at different times.

== History ==
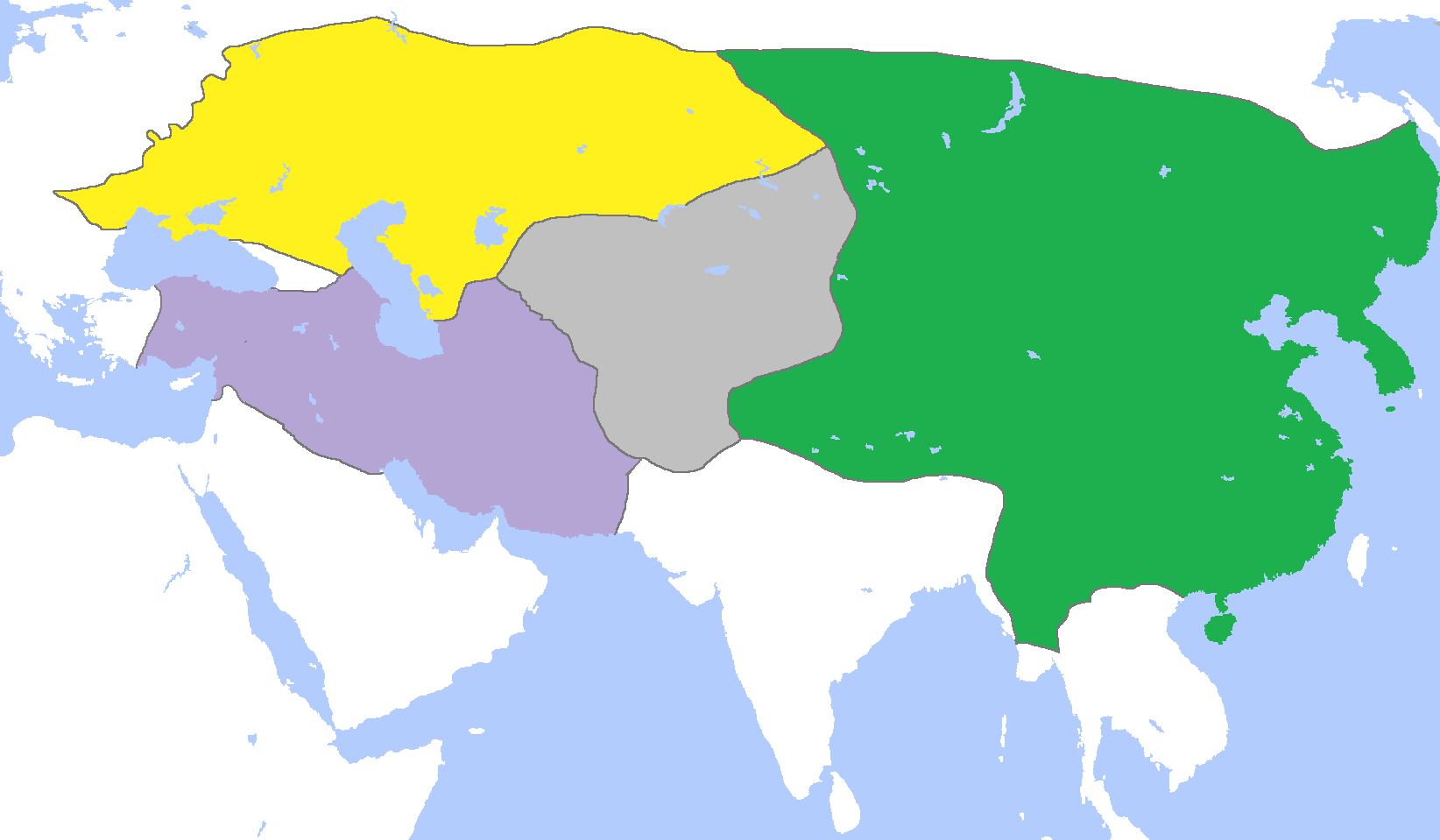
The division of the Mongol Empire c. 1300: Yuan dynasty; Golden Horde; Chagatai Khanate; Ilkhanate

=== Chagatai–Ilkhanid war ===
After the Toluid Civil War, Kublai Khan summoned Kaidu at his court, but Kaidu avoided appearing at his court, and his enmity was a constant obstacle to Kublai's ambitions to control the whole Mongol Empire.

Baraq was dispatched to Central Asia to take the throne of Chagatai Khanate in 1266, and almost immediately, he repudiated the authority of Kublai as Great Khan. Kaidu and Baraq fought for a while, and Kaidu gained control of the region around Bukhara. Kaidu convinced Baraq to attack the Persia-based Ilkhanate, which was an ally of Kublai Khan's Yuan dynasty based in China. A peace treaty was made among Mengu-Timur, khan of the Golden Horde, Kaidu, and Baraq against the Yuan dynasty and the Ilkhanate around 1267. However, Baraq suffered a heavy defeat at Herat on July 22, 1270, against Ilkhan Abagha. Baraq died en route to meet Kaidu who had been waiting for his weakness. The Chagatayid princes, including Mubarak Shah, submitted to Kaidu and proclaimed him as their overlord. The sons of Baraq rebelled against Kaidu but they were defeated. Many of the Chagatayid princes fled to the Ilkhanate. Kaidu's early attempt to rule the Chagatayids faced serious resistance. The Mongol princes such as Negübei, whom he appointed khan of the House of Chagatai, revolted several times. Stable control came when Duwa was made khan who became his number two in 1282. The Golden Horde, based in Sarai on the lower Volga in southern Russia, also became an ally of Kaidu.

=== Kaidu's invasion of the Yuan dynasty ===
In 1275, Kaidu invaded Ürümqi and demanded its submission, but the Buddhist Idiqut (then a Yuan vassal) resisted. Kublai sent a relief force to expel him. Kublai's son Nomukhan and generals occupied Almaliq in 1266–1276, to prevent Kaidu's invasion. In 1277, a group of Genghisid princes under Möngke's son Shiregi rebelled, kidnapping Kublai's two sons and his general Antong. The rebels handed Antong to Kaidu and the princes to Mengu-Timur. The army sent by Kublai Khan drove Shiregi's forces west of the Altai Mountains and strengthened Yuan garrisons in Mongolia and Xinjiang. However, Kaidu captured Almaliq.

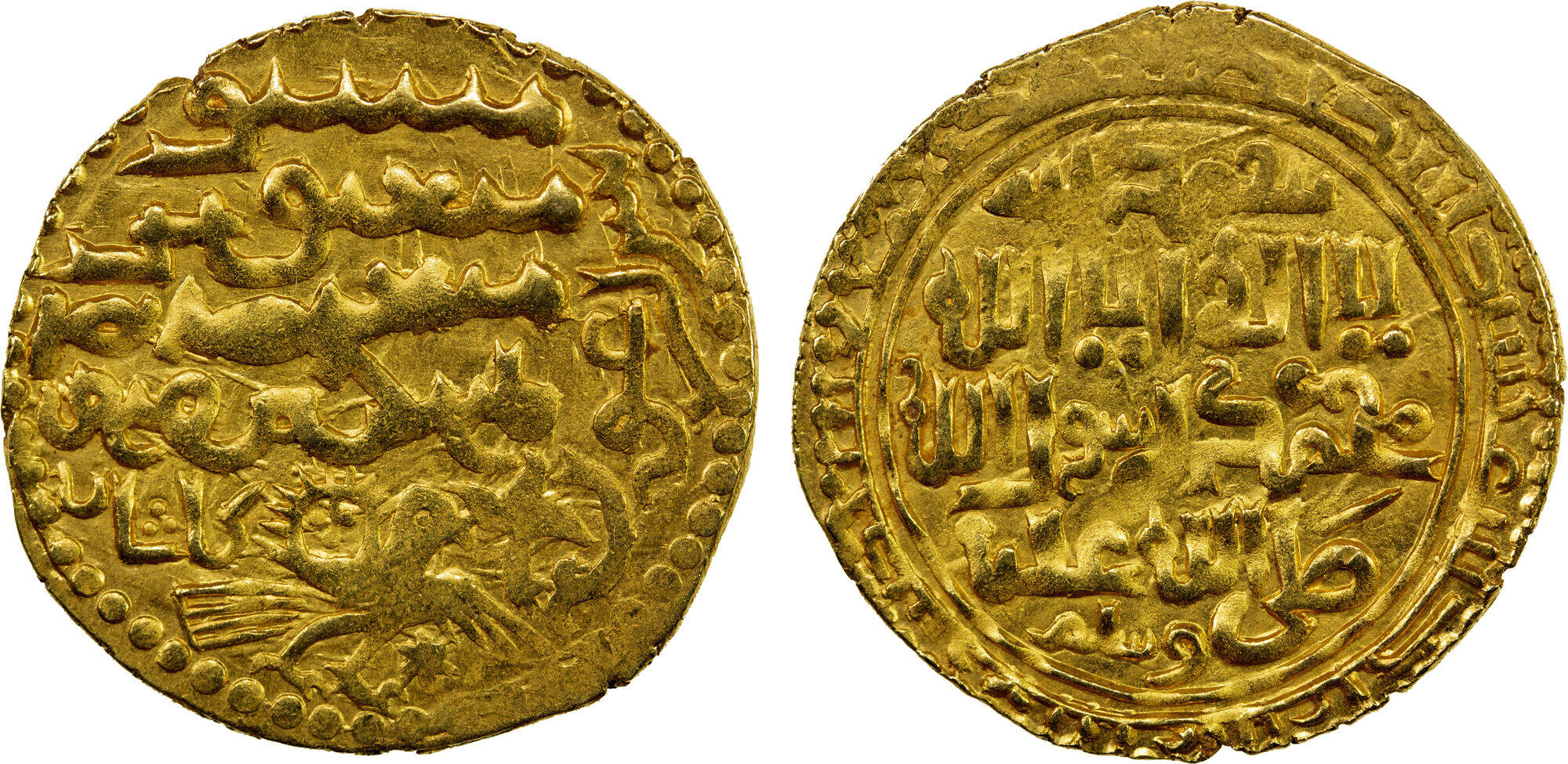
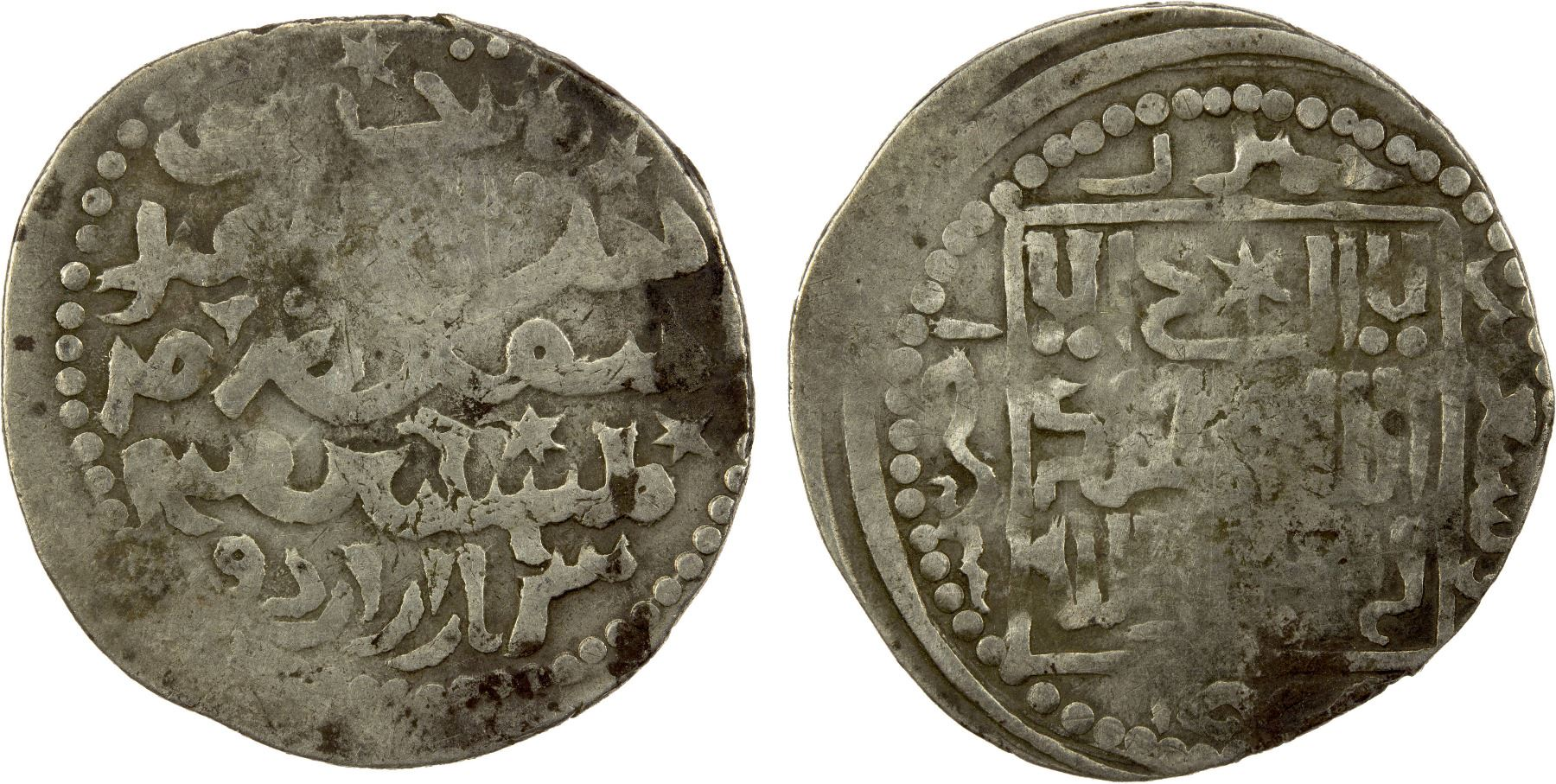
A bilingual Mongol-Arabic gold dinar of Arghun, the Mongol Ilkhan of Persia, bearing the Mongolian phrase Qaghan-u nereber, meaning “in the name of the Khagan (Kublai)”; and a bilingual Mongol-Arabic silver dirham of Orus, son of Kaidu, dating to the period of the Chaghatayid–Ögedeid occupation of Ilkhanid Khorasan (1290s), bearing the Mongolian phrase Qaidu-yin nereber, meaning “in the name of Kaidu.”

Kublai attempted to subject Kaidu to an economic siege by entrenching his forces in the Tarim basin and over the Uyghurs, cutting him off from these resources. In 1276, he stationed a garrison in Khotan and reinforced it several times between 1278 and 1283. In 1278 he stationed a garrison at Beshbalik, which from 1280 was under the Chinese general Qi Gongzhi. From 1281 to 1286 the garrison was reinforced, and the Chagatai prince Ajiqi was also sent to join the garrison. In 1281, 22 postal stations were set up between Beshbalik and Shanxi province, and more were set up to link Khotan and Cherchen in 1286. Military agricultural colonies (tuntian) were set up in Beshbalik in 1283 and 1286, and more set up between Khotan and Cherchen in 1287 in response to a famine in the Tarim basin. In 1278 a Qara Qocho regional supervision bureau was established, which later become a Pacification bureau, and in 1281, a Beshbalik protectorate was established. Through these, Yuan law and currency was imposed on the region. However, these measures were unsuccessful as the entire region was repeatedly raided by Kaidu and his allies. From 1288/89 the Yuan was forced to start withdrawing from Kashgar, Khotan and Beshbalik back to the interior of China proper.

Nevertheless, rulers of the Golden Horde withdrew their support from Kaidu after the death of Mengu-Timur; three leaders, Noqai, Todemongke and Konichi, of the Golden Horde made peace with Kublai in 1284. Both Noqai and Todemongke made peace with the Ilkhan Ahmad Teguder as well. To attract military support from the Jochids, Kaidu sponsored his own candidate Kobek for the throne of the Left wing of the Golden Horde from early 1290s. Supported by Kaidu's army, the Golden Horde's troops clashed with Kobek several times.

=== Return of Yuan ===
In 1293 Tutugh, a Kipchak commander of Kublai Khan occupied the Baarin tumen, who were allies of Kaidu, on the Ob River. Kublai Khan died in the next year and was succeeded by Temür Khan (Emperor Chengzong). From 1298 on Duwa increased his raids on the Yuan. He launched a surprise attack against the Yuan garrison under Temür's uncle Kokechu in Mongolia and captured Temür's grandson-in-law, George of the Ongud when he and his commanders were drunk. However, Duwa was defeated by the Yuan army under Ananda in Gansu and his son-in law and several relations were captured. Although, Duwa and the Yuan generals agreed to exchange their prisoners, Duwa and Kaidu executed George in revenge and cheated the Yuan officials. To reorganize the Yuan defence system in Mongolia, Temür appointed Darmabala's son Khayishan to replace Kokechu. The Yuan army defeated Kaidu south of the Altai Mountains. However, in 1300, Kaidu defeated Khayishan's force. Then Kaidu and Duwa mobilized a large army to attack Karakorum the next year. The Yuan army suffered heavy losses while both sides could not make any decisive victory in September. Duwa was wounded in the battle and Kaidu died soon thereafter.

Until this time Kaidu had waged almost continuous warfare for more than 30 years against Kublai and his successor Temür, though he eventually died in 1301 after the battle near Karakorum. The Kaidu–Kublai war had effectively deepened the fragmentation of the Mongol Empire, although a peace later came in 1304 which established the nominal suzerainty of the Yuan Emperors (or Khagans) over the western khanates.

== See also ==
- Toluid Civil War
- Division of the Mongol Empire
- Esen Buqa–Ayurbarwada war
- Yuan dynasty in Inner Asia
