= Oirat =

Oirat or Elut (Chinese: 厄魯特, Èlǔtè) may refer to:

- Oirats, the westernmost group of the Mongols
- Oirat language
