= Toluid Civil War =

1260–1264 war of succession in the Mongol Empire

- Part of the division of the Mongol Empire
Date	1260–1264
Location	Mongolia, northern and western China, and Central Asia under the Mongol Empire
Result	Kublai Khan victory
Territorial changes	Fragmentation of the Mongol Empire

Belligerents
Kublai Khan and his allies	Ariq Böke and his allies

Commanders and leaders
Kublai Khan; Hulagu; Kadan; Abishkhu †; Lian Xixian	Ariq Böke (surrendered); Berke; Alghu (defected to Kublai); Alandar (executed); Bolgay (executed); Khara Bukha; Liu Taiping

The Toluid Civil War was a war of succession fought between Kublai Khan and his younger brother, Ariq Böke, from 1260 to 1264. Möngke Khan died in 1259 with no declared successor, precipitating infighting between members of the Tolui family line for the title of Great Khan that escalated to a civil war. The Toluid Civil War, and the wars that followed it, such as the Berke–Hulegu war and the Kaidu–Kublai war, weakened the authority of the Great Khan over the Mongol Empire and split the empire into autonomous khanates.

== Background ==
The Tolui family successfully enthroned their candidate for Great Khan, Möngke, in the kurultais of 1250 and 1251. The Ögedeid candidate for Great Khan, Shiremun, and his cousin Nakhu, were embittered by their loss and plotted a failed assassination of Möngke. Möngke took revenge by purging his opponents in the royal house, and members of both the Chagatai and Ögedei families.

Möngke handed control over the Caucasus region to the Golden Horde in 1252. With the approval of Möngke, Berke succeeded his nephew, Ulaghchi, as the khan of the Golden Horde in Russia in 1257. Hulagu of the Ilkhanate seized control of the Caucasus from the Golden Horde, and his sacking of Baghdad in 1258 angered Berke, a convert to Islam. Möngke Khan died in 1259 without appointing a successor. He probably favored Ariq Böke, whom Möngke designated in 1258 as commander of Karakorum (then capital of the empire), but he did too little else to secure Ariq Böke's claim to the throne.

== Civil war ==
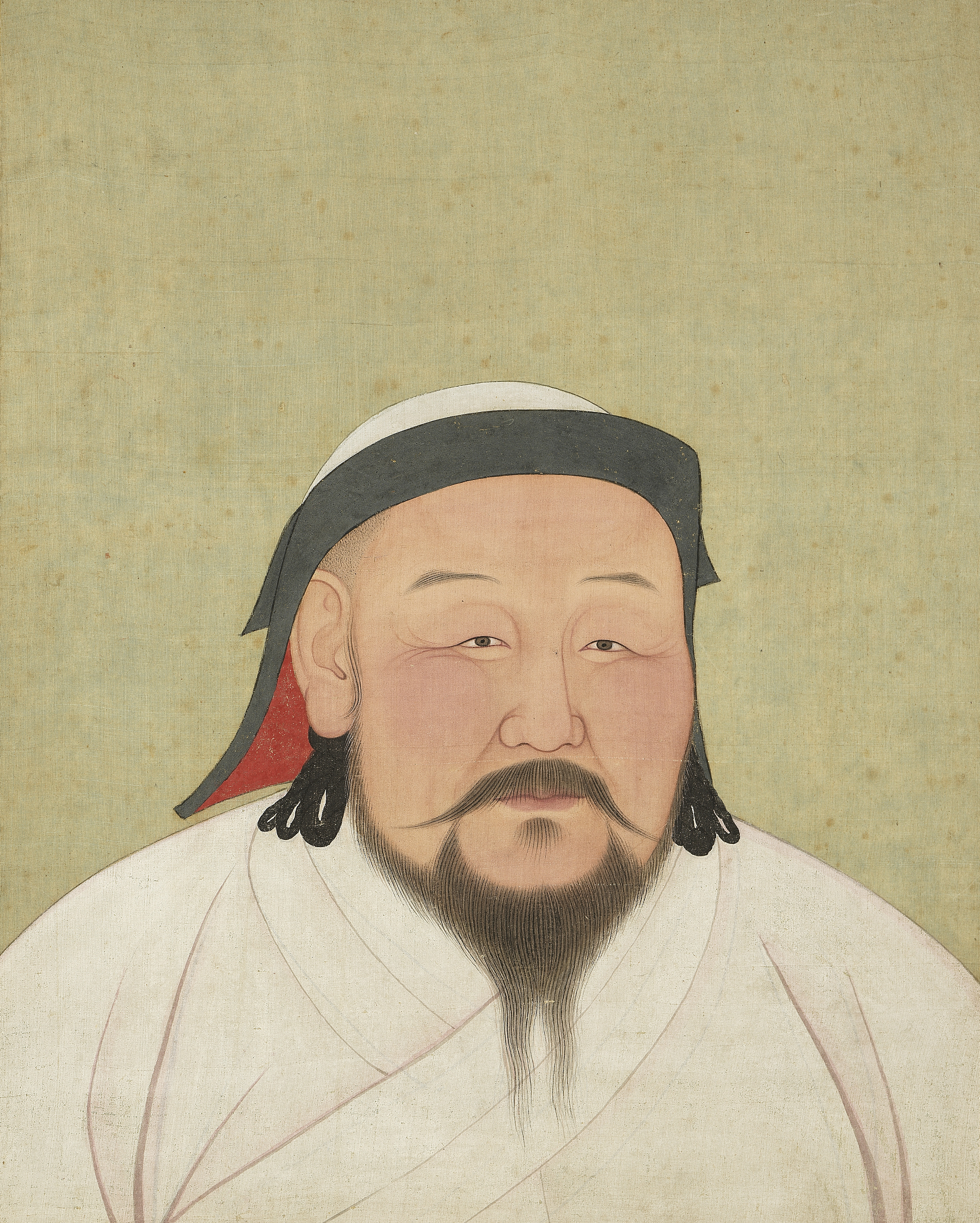
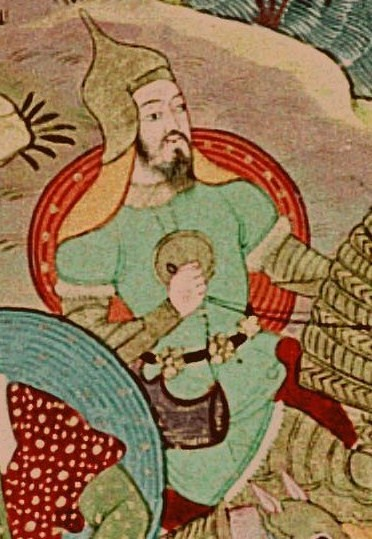
Kublai Khan (left) and Ariq Böke (right) fought a civil war for the title of Great Khan.

Kublai Khan was fighting against the southern Song in 1260 when he received news that Ariq Böke was challenging him for the succession of the throne. Ariq Böke formed alliances with powerful members of the Mongol nobility to endorse him as a candidate for Great Khan. Most of Möngke's immediate family supported Ariq Böke including the member of Ögedei, Chagatai and Jochi. Kublai withdrew from the Song and mobilized his troops to fight Ariq Böke. In China, Kublai summoned a kurultai at Kaiping, where he was elected Great Khan. This was the first kurultai to proclaim a Great Khan outside the Mongol homeland or Central Asia. Ariq Böke convened his own kurultai in Karakorum that proclaimed him Great Khan a month later, creating two rival claimants for the throne. Hulagu embarked for Mongolia to attend the kurultai, but the Mamluk defeat of the Mongols at the Battle of Ain Jalut in early September 1260 forced him to return to the Middle East. Berke capitalized on the Mamluk victory over Mongols by invading the Ilkhanate, beginning the Berke–Hulegu war.

Ariq Böke allied with Berke Khan of the Golden Horde and Alghu of the Chagatai Khanate. Hulagu of the Ilkhanate was the sole ally of Kublai Khan. Berke supported Ariq Böke because he was resentful of Hulagu, who had close ties with Kublai. However, Hulagu and Berke became occupied with their own war and could not intervene in the Toluid Civil War.

Kublai Khan had access to supplies from the fertile lands of China, while Ariq Böke had to import resources to Karakorum in the semi-arid steppes. Kublai Khan depended on these supplies from China and therefore needed Chinese popular support to win the civil war. Kublai ingratiated himself to his subjects with the help of his Chinese advisers. He presented himself as a sage emperor capable of uniting the Chinese, Korean and his fellow Mongols, while calling out Ariq Böke as a destructive usurper. Kublai promised to reduce taxes, modeled his government institutions to resemble those of the Chinese dynasties, and adopted the era name of Zhongtong, which means "moderate rule". His policies were popular in northern China, but had no impact on his relations with the Southern Song. The Song invaded while Kublai was preoccupied with the civil war, and recovered territory previously lost to the Mongols. Kublai dispatched a diplomat, Hao Jing, to discuss the prospects of a peaceful resolution to the war with the Southern Song. However, the Song rejected Kublai's overtures and imprisoned Hao for the next decade.

Kublai now controlled three of the four possible supply lines to Karakorum. Kadan, Kublai's Ögedeid ally, defended the territories of the former Western Xia from Ariq Böke and commanded the forces stationed in Gansu. Kublai's troops guarded the area surrounding Yan (modern Beijing). The only supply line still open to Ariq Böke was the Yenisei River valley in the northwest. When Kublai's army advanced towards Karakorum in late 1260, Ariq Böke retreated from Karakorum to a tributary of the Yenisei. The oncoming winter then compelled Kublai and Ariq Böke to encamp their armies and wait for spring.

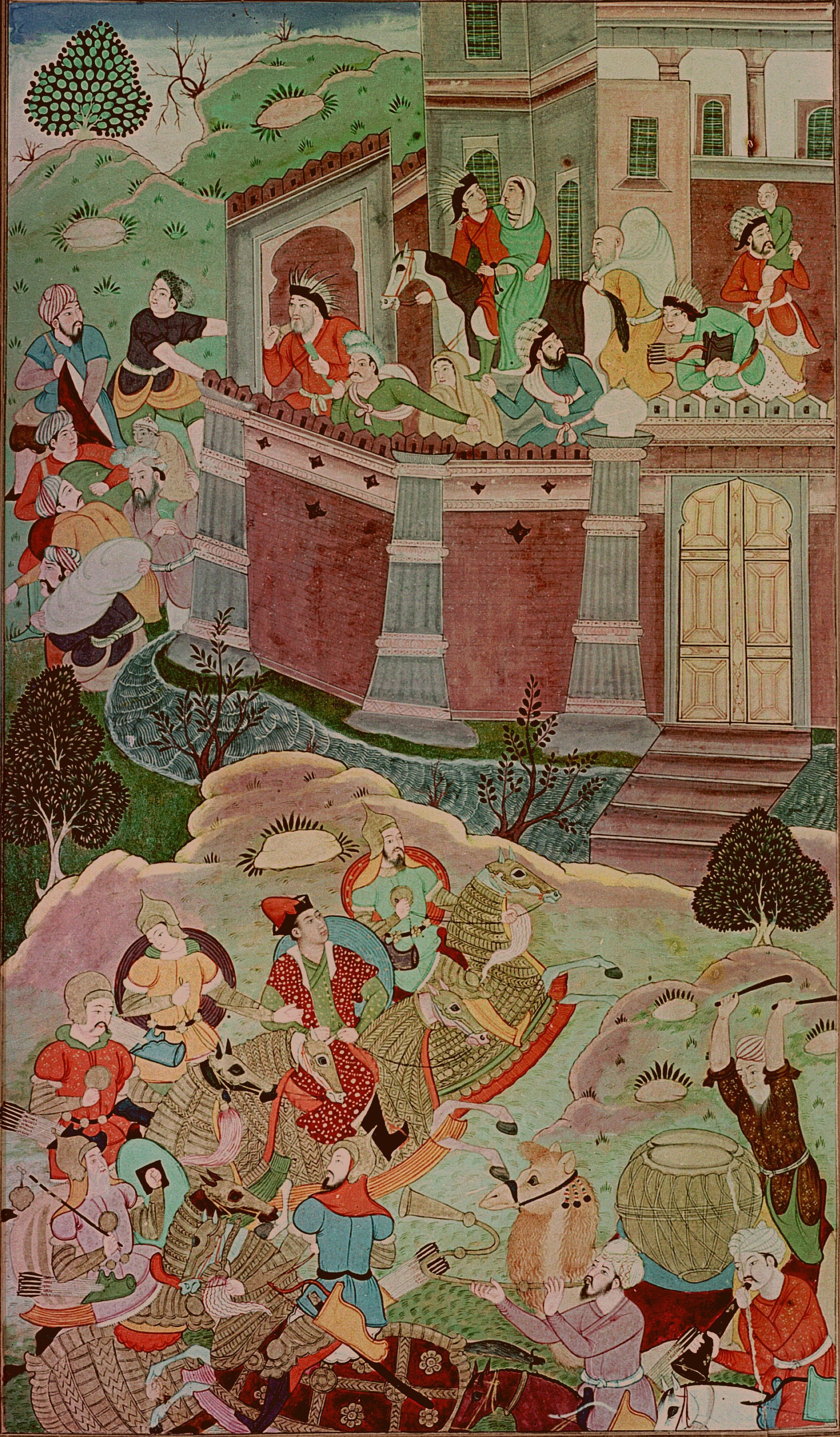
Ariq Böke's victory against Alghu

In the interim, Kublai acquired more supplies and men. He fortified Yan and the border defenses of northern China. Kadan defeated and executed Alandar, a general sent to secure the vital Central Asian trade routes for Ariq Böke. Lian Xixian, one of Kublai's Confucian advisers, commanded soldiers for the khan in western China. He won a victory against Ariq Böke's ally, Liu Taiping, in northwestern China, seizing food supplies intended for Ariq Böke's army. Lian also drove supporters of Ariq Böke out of the towns of Liangzhou and Ganzhou. In southwestern China, his forces protected Sichuan from Ariq Böke's encroaching troops. Kublai paid Kadan and Lian Xixian handsomely for their military service in gifts and promotions. He rewarded Kadan with 300 packs of silk and 300 taels of silver, and appointed Lian Xixian to the position of Prime Minister of the Right in the Secretariat.

Kublai's victories left Alghu as Ariq Böke's only standing ally. Ariq Böke convinced Alghu to take control of the Chagatai Khanate in Central Asia. Chagatai's khan, Qara Hülëgü, had recently died. Alghu fought and killed Abishkha, a rival claimant to the throne endorsed by Kublai as ruler of the khanate. Alghu was one of Ariq Böke's strongest supporters and he appointed him khan of Chagatai. The khanate became an important source of Ariq Böke's provisions. Ariq Böke gave Alghu complete control over tax revenues in the region.

In 1261, Kublai and Ariq Böke engaged in battle at Shimultai. Ariq Böke lost the battle and retreated. He returned to the region ten days later to challenge Kublai's forces near the Khingan Mountains of eastern Mongolia. The troops that Ariq Böke attacked were not personally led by Kublai, and made up only a small portion of Kublai's army. Even so, the battle ended in a stalemate. Meanwhile, most of Mongolia was now under the control of Kublai, threatening Ariq Böke's control of the Yenisei Valley supply line. A weakened Ariq Böke entreated Alghu for help. Alghu refused, and executed the envoys sent by Ariq Böke, who had demanded a share of Alghu's tax revenues.

At this time, a rebellion in China distracted Kublai from the civil war, and he departed for Kaiping instead of further pursuing Ariq Böke. Ariq Böke went to war with Alghu after the threat of an attack by Kublai receded. Alghu defeated Ariq Böke's commander, Khara Bukha, near the Ili River in Xinjiang, but lost his headquarters at Almalikh to Ariq Böke. He withdrew to the oasis cities of the Tarim Basin.

Ariq Böke was now left with few allies, and several of his supporters deserted from his side following his action and atrocities against the Chagatai Khanate. Ürüng Tash, son of Möngke, defected, taking his father's tamga seal from Ariq Böke and giving it to Kublai as a symbol of his loyalty. Alghu then returned to the Ili River to remove Ariq Böke from Xinjiang. Ariq Böke lacked the resources or the allies to defend himself. He traveled to Shangdu alone and surrendered to Kublai in 1264, ending the civil war.

== Aftermath ==
Kublai imprisoned Ariq Böke, but did not immediately punish him. Kublai's supporters wanted retribution, so Kublai ignored Ariq Böke for a year as punishment. He conducted a purge to eliminate officials in the Mongol government who sympathized with Ariq Böke. Kublai accused Bolghai, an important Mongol official who served under Möngke, of treachery for conspiring with Ariq Böke. Kublai authorized the execution of Bolghai and other Ariq Böke supporters. Kublai summoned a kurultai to decide a punishment for Ariq Böke and solidify his own claim to the throne. Kublai was reluctant to punish his brother without public support of the Mongol nobility. Ariq Böke died mysteriously in 1266 while still imprisoned, leading to speculation that Kublai had secretly poisoned him.

Ariq Böke's defeat by Kublai could not stop the fracturing of the empire. When Kublai convened his kurultai to confirm his status as Great Khan, none of the three other khans attended. Berke and Hulagu continued fighting, until Hulagu died in 1265. The Ögedei line sought to exploit the disunity to advance the interests of their own family. They held a grudge against the Tolui family for the kurultai of 1251 and the subsequent purge of the Ögedeids after the assassination plot. Kaidu, from the Ögedei family, believed that a member of the Ögedeids deserved the title of Great Khan and started an insurrection in 1269 against Kublai that lasted for decades.

Most of the western khanates did not recognize Kublai as Great Khan. Although some of them still asked Kublai to confirm the enthronement of their new regional khans, the four khanates were functionally independent sovereign states. The Ilkhanate based in Persia and the Yuan dynasty based in China had close diplomatic relations, and shared scientific and cultural knowledge, but military cooperation between all four Mongol khanates would never occur again — the united Mongol Empire had disintegrated.

== See also ==
- Berke–Hulegu war
- Kaidu–Kublai war
- Division of the Mongol Empire
