= Alghu =

Alghu Khan
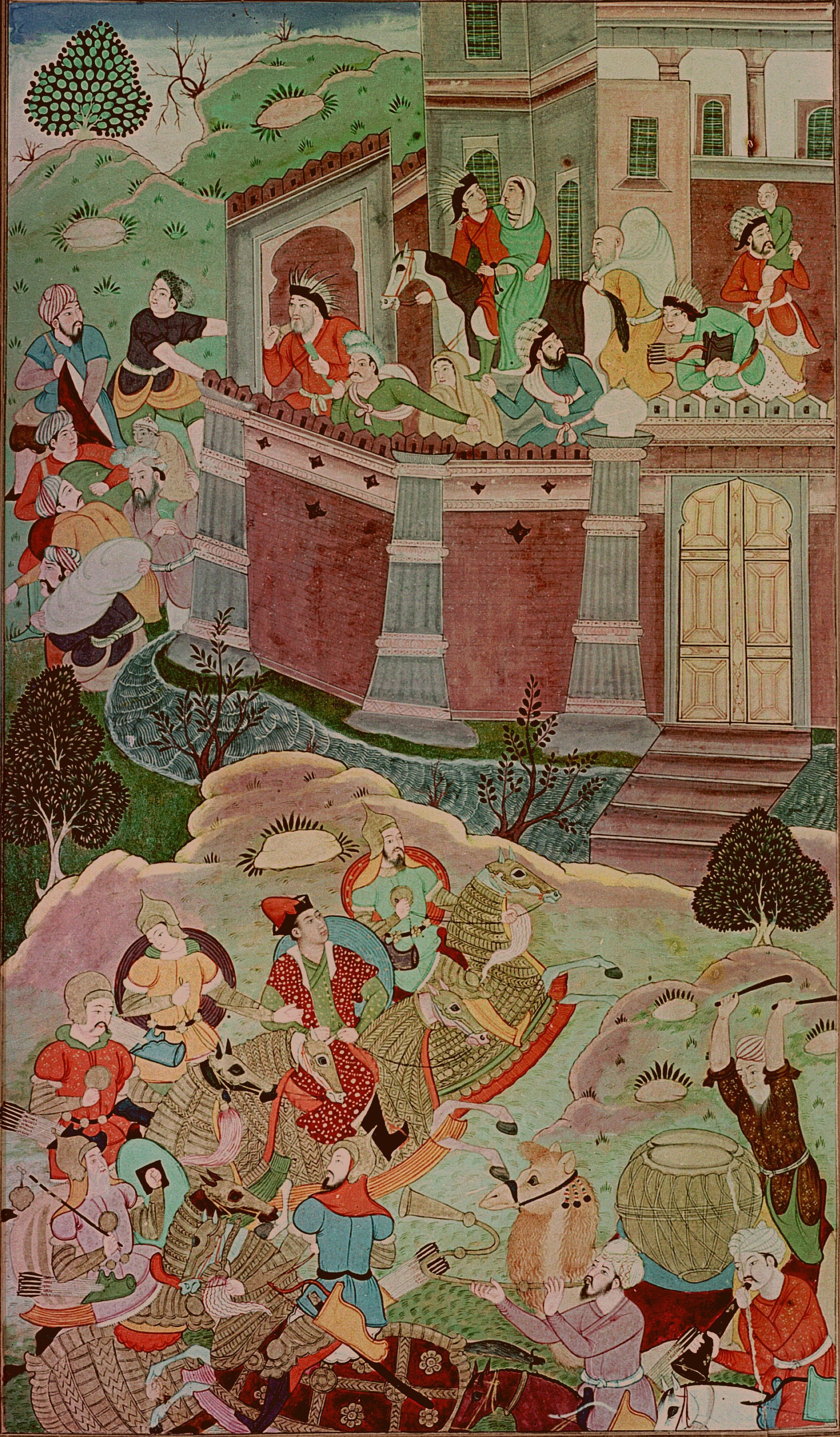
- Ariq Böke defeats Alghu from Rashid to Al Jami al Tavarikh, drawn 1596 by Miskin Although the event was portrayed in early 13th Century Mongolia, the people wear the costume Moghul of 1596CE

Khan of the Chagatai Khanate
- Reign: 1260–1265
- Predecessor: Mubarak Shah (under the regency of Orghana)
- Successor: Mubarak Shah
- Sahib-i Divan: Mas'ud Beg
- Died: 1265; Olmaliq, Uzbekistan
- Burial: Almaliq
- Spouse: Orghana
- Father: Baidar

Alghu (died 1265 or 1266) was the khan of the Chagatai Khanate (1260–1265/6). He was the son of Baidar and the grandson of Chagatai Khan.

== Biography ==
In 1260 Alghu was appointed as head of the ulus of the Chagatai Khanate by the Great Khan claimant Ariq Böke, in opposition to the child khan Mubarak Shah and his mother Orghana, marrying her. In 1261 he was sent to Central Asia, where he quickly established control of much of the Chagatai Khanate, as well as other areas, particularly those that were formerly under the control of the Blue Horde. He also seized control of Samarkand and Bukhara, which had earlier been ruled jointly by the Chagatai Khan and the Great Khan. Alghu supported Ariq Böke in the Toluid Civil War against Kublai Khan, but later deserted him. In 1262 he rebelled against Ariq Boke and commanded 150,000 soldiers against him; the conflict saw a series of violent clashes over the next two years. Alghu gained the support of the Great Khan's governor of Turkestan, Mas'ud Beg, making him his vizier, as well as of Orghana. The revolt severely weakened Ariq Böke's and contributed to his eventual loss to Kublai Khan.

In 1263 Alghu declared his allegiance to Kublai, and then attacked Kaidu, whose lands bordered his, under the pretext that the latter had supported Ariq Böke. Kaidu turned to Berke, Khan of the Blue Horde, for assistance; the latter provided him with resources and an army. Alghu found his territories invaded, and was defeated by Kaidu in battle. However, Alghu struck back and was victorious in a new battle near Otrar. He was buried in Almaliq.

== Family ==
He was married to Orghana Khatun and several other wives, with whom he had three sons:

1. Qaban
2. Chübei — created Prince of Weiwu (威武王) and Prince of Xining (西宁王) in 1304
  - Toqta
  - Yasa'ur
  - Düküles
  - Ejil Buqa
  - Nom-Quli — 2nd Prince of Xining (西宁王), became ancestor of Kara Del rulers
  - Aq Buqa
  - Sati
  - Da'ud
  - Gambo Dorji
  - Chigin-Temur
  - Jirghudai
  - Mingtash
  - Könchek Dorji.
3. Toq-Temür
  1. Esen Böke
  2. Oqruqchi
