= Ibaqa Beki =

Kerait princess and wife of Genghis Khan

- Khatun
- Spouse: Genghis Khan (1204–1206, div.); Jürchedei (1206–?)
Era dates
- Early 13th century
- House: Kerait
- Father: Jakha Gambhu
- Religion: Nestorian Christianity

Ibaqa Beki (Mongolian: Ибага бэхи) was a Kerait princess and Mongol khatun active in the early 13th century. She was briefly married to Genghis Khan, the founder of the Mongol Empire, and subsequently married to the general Jürchedei.

== Family and first marriage ==
She was the eldest daughter of the Kerait leader Jakha Gambhu, who allied with Genghis Khan to defeat the Naimans in 1204. As part of the alliance, Ibaqa was given to Genghis Khan as a wife. She was the sister of Begtütmish, who married Genghis Khan's son Jochi, and Sorghaghtani Beki, who married Genghis Khan's son Tolui. The latter sister became one of the most powerful and influential figures in the Mongol Empire.

== Second marriage ==
After about two years of childless marriage, Genghis Khan abruptly divorced Ibaqa and gave her to the general Jürchedei, a member of the Uru'ut clan who killed Ibaqa's father Jakha Gambhu when he rebelled against Genghis Khan. The exact reason for this remarriage is unknown: According to The Secret History of the Mongols, Genghis Khan gave Ibaqa to Jürchedei as a reward for his service in wounding Nilga Senggum in 1203 and, later, in killing Jakha Gambhu.

Conversely, Rashid al-Din in Jami' al-tawarikh claims that Genghis Khan divorced Ibaqa due to a nightmare in which God commanded him to give her away immediately, and Jürchedei happened to be guarding the tent. Regardless of the rationale, Genghis Khan allowed Ibaqa to keep her title as Khatun even in her remarriage, and asked that she leave him a token of her dowry by which he could remember her. The sources also agree that Ibaqa was quite wealthy. In her new marriage, she relocated to northern China and gave birth to children. Jürchedei, as a son-in-law of the Khan via his new marriage, was granted 4,000 men to command, all of whom were fellow Uru'uts.

When Ögedei Khan, Ibaqa's former step-son, died on 11 December, 1241, likely from alcohol poisoning or organ failure after a drunken party the night before, Ibaqa, along with Al Altan, the youngest daughter of Genghis Khan's chief wife, Börte, were each suspected of poisoning Ögedei. Ibaqa was cleared after a well-respected Jalayir general, who was loyal to the Ögedeyids, Eljigidei, protested that the women were innocent because Ögedei's alcoholism was too well known for poison to be believable as his killer. While Ibaqa escaped the charges, Al Altan was later executed.

Anne F. Broadbridge notes that the remarriage of Ibaqa weakened, either inadvertently or deliberately, the kin network of Kerait wives within the Genghisid family, although the network remained in place. Every year she would return to Mongolia to renew court connections, host parties, and confer with her sister Sorghaghtani.
