= Shengwu qinzheng lu =

Chinese translation of a Mongolian chronicle

The Shengwu qinzheng lu (Chinese: 聖武親征錄; lit. 'Records of the Campaigns of (the) Shengwu (Emperor)') is a Chinese translation of a Mongolian chronicle describing the lives of Genghis Khan (previously named Temüjin) and his son Ögedei Khan. Much of the chronicle was derived from the Altan Debter (lit. 'Golden Book'), a now-lost state history of the Mongol Empire. Both the Persian Jami' al-tawarikh, written by Rashid al-Din at the start of the 14th century, and the Chinese Yuán Shǐ, drew upon the Altan Debter. By combining the three extant works, historians are able to adequately reconstruct the Altan Debter's original content.

The earliest mention of the Shengwu in documents was as a presentation to Khubilai Khan by one of his ministers in 1288, under the name Shilu (lit. 'Veritable Records'). Unsatisfied, the Khan demanded that the minister revise the sections on Ögedei, which were finalized in 1290. The work was then transcribed into Mongolian script. The later translation into Chinese came in 1369, as editors under the succeeding Ming dynasty compiled the entire Yuán Shǐ. By comparing the translation to the Jami' al-tawarikh, it becomes clear that these transcribers misunderstood the original script in several places, creating problems for modern historians.

The Shengwu serves as an interesting contrast to the most famous Mongol chronicle, The Secret History of the Mongols. It does not mention potentially objectionable moments that the Secret History openly describes, such as the young Temüjin's murder of his half-brother Behter or the abduction and rape of his wife Börte. It was probably intended as an official history. The consequential lack of drama in the text, alongside some fragmentation of the work, has led to it being overshadowed by the Secret History.
