= Altan Debter =

Lost Mongolian book

The Altan Debter (Persian: آلتان دبتر, from Mongolian Cyrillic: Алтан дэвтэр Altan devter, Mongolian script: ᠠᠯᠲᠠᠨ ᠳᠡᠪᠲᠡᠷ Altan debter, the Golden Book) is an early, now lost history of the Mongols. Rashid-al-Din Hamadani had access to it when writing his Chronicles, Jami al-Tawarikh. Some believe that The Secret History of the Mongols is based on it, though the historian David Morgan argues that the two sources, though in agreement on broad facts and events, are "clearly quite independent of each other." It also inspired the still-extant Shengwu qinzheng lu.

== Details ==
The book was stored in the state archive of the Ilkhans in the form of separate sheets. Some of the sheets were never put in order. The book was written in the Mongolian language and was therefore considered sacred. Only the nobles and princes belonging to the ruling Mongol dynasty had access to the book.

The real identity of the author of the book remains unknown.
