= Mughal-Mongol genealogy =

Genealogical relationship between rulers

The rulers of the Mughal Empire shared certain genealogical relations with the Mongol royals. As they emerged in a time when this distinction had become less common, the Mughals' identification as such has stuck and they have become known as one of the last Mongol successor states. As descendants of Timur, they are also members of the Timurid dynasty, and therefore were connected to other royal families in the Mediterranean, Middle East, and Far East. As such, the Mughal Empire was descended from two powerful dynasties.

Babur was also directly descended from Genghis Khan through his son Chagatai Khan.

Tumbinai Setsen Khan
Kabul Khan
Bartan Baghatur
Hoelun	Yesügei Bagatur
Börte	Genghis Khan	Hasar	Hachiun	Temüge	Belgutei	Behter
Jochi	Chagatai	Töregene; Khatun	Ögedei	Sorghaghtani; Beki	Tolui
Batu	Berke	Baidar	Güyük	Kashin	Kadan
Sartaq	Yesü Möngke	Yesünto'a	Alghu	Kaidu
Baraq	Möngke	Kublai Khan	Hulagu	Ariq Böke
Yasa'ur	Duwa	Zhenjin	Abaqa Khan
Qazan Khan	Duwa Temür	Esen Buqa I	Tarmashirin	Temür	Arghun	Gaykhatu
Saray Mulk Khanum	Timur	Tughlugh Timur	Ghazan	Öljaitü
Shah Rukh	Miran Shah	Miz Ga La	Ilyas Khoja	Abu Sa'id Bahadur Khan
Sultan Ibrahim	Muhammad Mirza	Uwais Khan
‘Abdullah	Abu Sa'id Mirza	Yunus Khan	Esen Buqa II
Sultan Ahmad	Umar Sheikh Mirza	Qutlugh Khanum	Mahmud Khan	Dost Muhammad
Babur	Mirza Dughlat	Kebek Sultan
Gulbadan Begum	Gulchehra Begum	Humayun	Kamran Mirza	Askari Mirza	Hindal
Akbar	Muhammad Hakim
Jahangir	Murad	Daniyal
Sultan Nisar Begum	Khusrau Mirza	Parwez	Bahar Banu Begum	Shah Jahan	Shahrayar
Dara Shikoh	Shah Shuja	Jahanara Begum	Roshanara Begum	Aurangzeb	Murad Baksh
Muhammad Azam Shah	Bahadur Shah I	Muhammad Akbar	Muhammad Kam Baksh
Azim-ush-Shan	Rafi'u-sh-shan	Jahandar Shah	Khujista Akhtar	Nekosiyar	Muhayyiu-s-sana
Farrukhsiyar	Shah Jahan II	Rafi'u-d-Darjat	Muhammad Ibrahim	Alamgir II	Muhammad Shah	Shah Jahan III
Shah Alam II	Ahmad Shah Bahadur
Akbar Shah II	Bedar Bakht
Qutb-ud-din	Mirza Jahan Shah	Bahadur Shah Zafar	Mirza Salim
Mirza Fakhru	Mirza Mughal	Mirza Dara Bakht	Mirza Shah Abbas

== See also ==
- Family tree of the Mongol Khans
- Timurid family tree
- Family tree of the Mughal Emperors
- Safavid dynasty family tree
- Turco-Mongol tradition

== Notes ==
- Columbia Encyclopedia, Sixth Edition, 2001–2005. "Tamerlane, c.1336–1405, Turkic conqueror, b. Kesh, near Samarkand. He is also called Timur Leng (Faisal R.). The son of a tribal leader, in 1370 Timur became an in-law of a direct descendant of Genghis Khan, when he destroyed the army of Husayn of Balkh. After the battle, he took Husayn of Balkh's widow, Saray Mulk-khanum (daughter of Qazan, the last Chaghatai Khan of Mawarannah, into his harem as his fourth wife. For the rest of his life he called himself Temür Gurgan - son-in-law- of the Great Khan Khan. Timur spent his early military career subduing his rivals in what is now Turkistan; by 1369 he controlled the entire area from his capital at Samarkand."
- Mirza Muhammad Haidar. "Silk Road". Seattle: University of Washington. "On the occasion of the birth of Babar Padishah (the son of Omar Shaikh)"
- Tarikh-i-Rashidi: A History of the Moghuls of Central Asia. Elias and Denison Ross (ed. and trans.). 1898, reprinted 1972. ISBN 0-7007-0021-8
