= Genghis Khan: To the Ends of the Earth and Sea =

- Japanese poster
- Directed by: Shinichiro Sawai
- Written by: Takehiro Nakajima; Shōichi Maruyama
- Based on: Novels by Seiichi Morimura
- Produced by: Minoru Ebihara; Haruki Kadokawa; Katsuhito Matsuura; Yutaka Okada; Akihiko Ōsugi; Yoshiaki Tokutome
- Starring: Takashi Sorimachi; Rei Kikukawa; Mayumi Wakamura
- Cinematography: Yonezō Maeda
- Edited by: Akimasa Kawashima
- Music by: Taro Iwashiro
- Production companies: Genghis Khan: To the Ends of the Earth and Sea FPC (Kadokawa Haruki, Avex, H.I.S., Tokyo FM, Shochiku, Yahoo! Japan, Japan FM Network, Yomiuri Shimbun, Japan Airlines)
- Distributed by: Shochiku (Japan); Funimation (U.S.)
- Release dates: March 3, 2007 (Japan); February 21, 2008 (U.S. limited)
- Running time: 136 minutes
- Countries: Japan; Mongolia
- Language: Japanese
- Budget: US$30 million

Genghis Khan: To the Ends of Earth and Sea (Japanese: 蒼き狼 地果て海尽きるまで, Hepburn: Aoki Ōkami: Chi Hate Umi Tsukiru Made; lit. "The Blue Wolf: To the Ends of the Earth and Sea") is a 2007 Japanese-Mongolian historical drama film depicting the life of Genghis Khan.

== Plot ==
Temujin (Takashi Sorimachi) is born to the chief of a Mongolian tribe, and grows up as the one who carries the blood of “blue wolf”. He grows up and marries Börte (Rei Kikukawa). But one night, she is taken away by another tribe. Temujin rescues her, only to find her pregnant. She later gives birth to a boy. As the boy may be a son of a stranger, Temujin names him Kuchi (Kenichi Matsuyama), meaning outsider, and refuses to accept him as his son. The time goes on and Temujin is enthroned as the King of Mongolia. He changes his name to Genghis Khan and pledges to avenge his long-time enemy, the Jin Dynasty. Genghis Khan finally acknowledges Kuchi as his own son, and they decide to fight together, but Kuchi is killed by the enemy. The lonely battle of Genghis continues without end. A historical drama about the life of Genghis Khan, a hero who united the Mongol Empire and conquered half the known world.

== Cast ==
- Takashi Sorimachi as Temüjin
- Rei Kikukawa as Börte
- Kenichi Matsuyama as Kuchi
- Yoshihiko Hakamada as Hasar
- Go Ara as Khulan
- Yūsuke Hirayama as Jamukha
- Naoki Hosaka as Yesügei Bagatur
- Hiroki Matsukata as Toghrul Khan
- Eugene Nomura as Bo'orču
- Eri Shimomiya as Temulen
- Shōhei Yamazaki as Behter
- Kairi Narita as Belgutei
- Takuya Noro as Chilaun
- Sōsuke Ikematsu as young Temüjin
- Ami Takeishi as young Börte
- Takeshi Ōbayashi as Caravan Chief

== Production ==
Takehiro Nakajima and Shōichi Maruyama adapted the screenplay from the historical-fiction novels Chi Hate Umi Tsukiru Made: Shōsetsu Chingisu Hān (Ue) and Chi Hate Umi Tsukiru Made: Shōsetsu Chingisu Hān (Shita) by Seiichi Morimura.

The film cost US$30 million to make, and was filmed over four months in 2006 in Mongolia, featuring more than 27,000 extras, as well as 5,000 Mongolian Army soldiers.

== Release ==
Genghis Khan: To the Ends of Earth and Sea was released in Japan on March 3, 2007, and in Hong Kong on April 26, 2007. The film was screened at the Cannes Film Market, the Moscow International Film Festival and the 2007 Antalya Golden Orange Film Festival. It was the opening film of the 5th World Film Festival of Bangkok and the San Francisco Asian Film Festival.

Genghis Khan was released by The Bigger Picture in only 40 U.S. theaters on February 21, 2008. As of February 25, it has made only US$3,892 there. It grossed nearly US$11 million in Japan and Mongolia.

Genghis Khan was released on DVD in the US in 2008.

== See also ==
- List of Asian historical drama films
