= Muhammad Haidar Mirza (I) Dughlat =

Muhammad Haidar Mirza was the Dughlat amir of Kashgar from c. 1465 until 1480. He was the grandfather and namesake of the historian Muhammad Haidar Mirza (1499/1500-1551).

== Life ==
=== Early years ===
Muhammad Haidar Mirza was the son of Amir Sayyid Ali and Urun Sultan Khanim, the aunt of the Moghul Yunus Khan. When his father died in 1457–58 his elder brother Saniz Mirza succeeded him as ruler of the territory between Kashgar and Yarkand. Keeping Yarkand for himself, Saniz Mirza gave Kashgar and Yangi Hisar to Muhammad Haidar and his mother.

When the Moghul khan Esen Buqa died in 1462, the succession was disputed between his brother Yunus Khan and his son Dost Muhammad. The Dughlat amirs were similarly split over whom to recognize as their suzerain. Muhammad Haidar favored Dost Muhammad, but Saniz Mirza supported Yunus Khan. As a result, relations between the two brothers grew hostile, and Muhammad Haidar was compelled to flee Kashgar for Aksu, where Dost Muhammad resided. Saniz Mirza then took over Kashgar.

Saniz Mirza ruled Kashgar until his death in 1464–65. Now the senior member of the Dughlat family, Muhammad Haidar was reinstalled in Kashgar. Shortly afterwards Dost Muhammad arrived in Kashgar and plundered the town; this act enraged Muhammad Haidar and caused him to defect to the side of Yunus Khan. Thereafter Muhammad Haidar and Yunus Khan were on generally good terms with one another.

=== Conflict With Aba Bakr ===
During Muhammad Haidar's reign in Kashgar, his brother Saniz Mirza's son Mirza Aba Bakr arrived in the town. After some time Mirza Aba Bakr left Kashgar and seized control of Yarkand; he then declared his submission to Muhammad Haidar.

After taking control of Khotan as well, however, Mirza Aba Bakr turned rebellious against his uncle and proceeded to devastate the region around Kashgar and Yangi Hisar. Muhammad Haidar sent an army to quell him; when this force was defeated he took the field in person against his nephew but lost a battle against him as well. In 1479 he asked for assistance from Yunus Khan; the two jointly marched against Yarkand but Mirza Aba Bakr defeated them and forced them to retreat.

In 1480 Yunus Khan and Muhammad Haidar assembled a larger force and against advanced against Yarkand. Both of them were again defeated and compelled to withdraw from Kashgar. Acting on Yunus Khan's advice, Muhammad Haidar abandoned Kashgar and left with the khan for Aksu. Aba Bakr Mirza then proceeded to occupy Kashgar.

=== Final Years ===
After some time in Aksu, Muhammad Haidar led a brief revolt against Yunus Khan on behalf of the latter's son Ahmad Khan. The rebellion quickly failed and both Ahmad Khan and Muhammad Haidar Mirza were pardoned. Muhammad Haidar afterwards accompanied Yunus Khan north into Moghulistan, and from there into the Timurid principality of Ferghana, which was controlled by Omar Shaikh. The latter gave the province of Ush to Yunus Khan, who turned it over to Muhammad Haidar.

After Yunus Khan returned to Moghulistan, however, Omar Shaikh decided to reclaim Ush; Muhammad Haidar decided to depart the area for Kashgar. Upon reaching the town, however, he was imprisoned by Mirza Aba Bakr for one year. After he was released he traveled first to Badakhshan and then to Samarkand, where he was treated as a guest of the local Timurid princes. He was eventually recalled by Yunus Khan, who was then on his deathbed. Departing Samarkand, he went to Tashkent and treated the khan during his illness. He presumably died not long after.
