= Battle of Daohuigu =

13th century AD conflict in China

- Part of the Mongol–Jin War
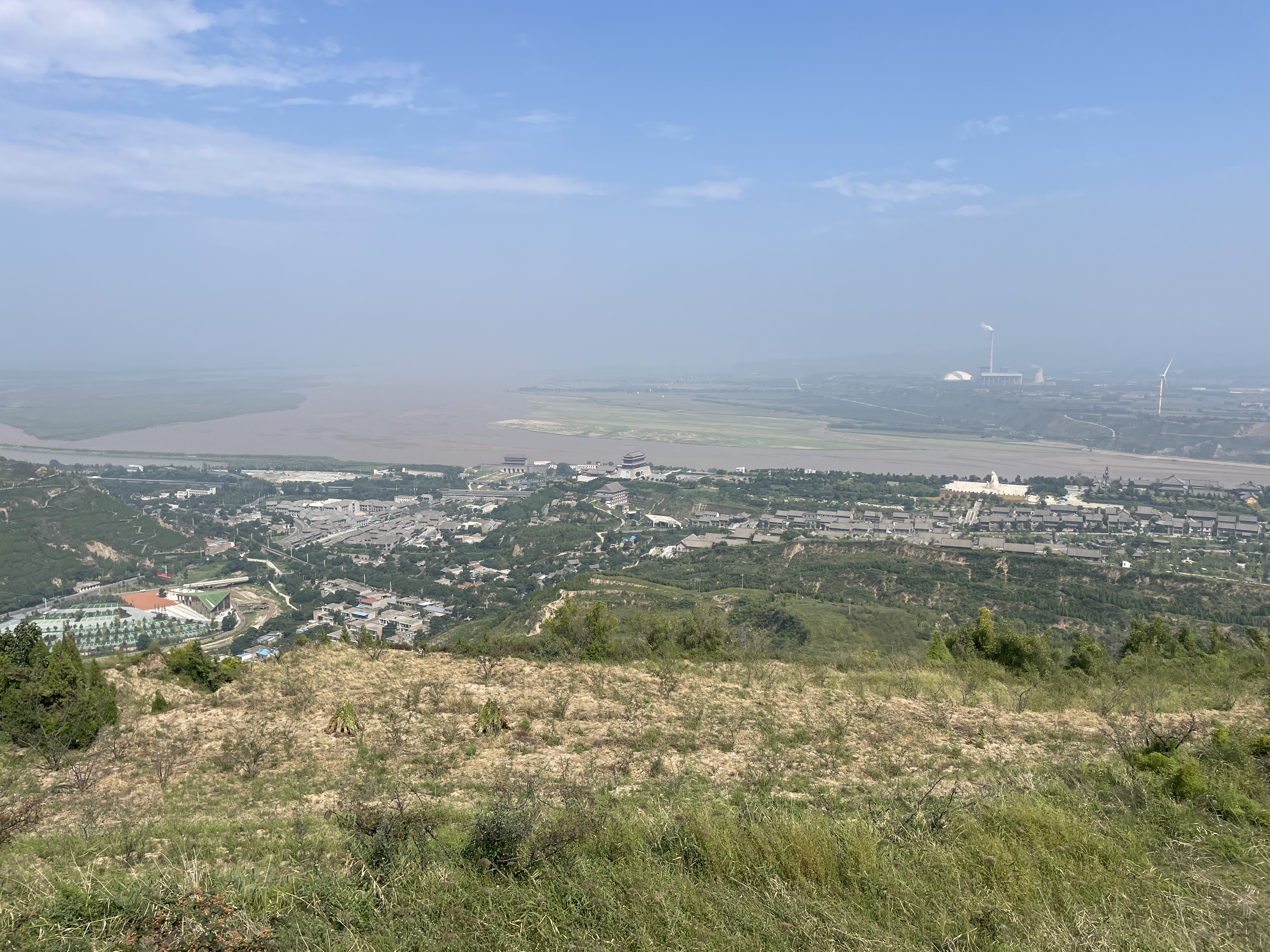
- Modern day view of Tongguan Pass
Date	1231
Location	Daohuigu (Present-day Shaanxi)
Result	Jin victory

Belligerents
Mongol Empire	Jin Dynasty

Commanders and leaders
Ögedei Khan; Tolui; Subutai	Wanyan Heda; Yila Pua; Wanyan Chenheshang

Strength
100,000: Unknown size led by Subutai	Unknown total size: 11,000 led by Wanyan Chenheshang

Casualties and losses
Heavy losses for Subutai's forces	Unknown

The Battle of Daohuigu (Chinese: 倒回谷之戰) took place between the Mongol Empire and the Jin Dynasty during the Mongol conquest of the Jin dynasty. The battle was fought twice, in November 1230 and January 1231.

Second Battle of Daohuigu was one of the few instances where Subutai was defeated in battle, although some sources claim the fault lay mainly on Ögedei Khan's judgement and Subutai was merely a scapegoat.

== Background ==
The Mongol Empire had suffered setbacks in its offensive against the Jin Dynasty after Ögedei Khan became head of the empire. In 1229, Mongol forces were defeated at the Battle of Dachangyuan and the siege of Qingyang city had to be lifted. The following year, Mongol forces were defeated again at the Battle of Weizhou. Both battles involved Jin general Wanyan Chenheshang, who commanded the Zhongxiao (Loyalty) army which consisted of various ethnic groups that were attacked by the Mongols. These included other Mongols, Naimans, Uyghurs, Tanguts, Han Chinese, and even Kipchaks.

Ögedei was enraged by the news of defeats, especially after Jin general Yila Pua sent a message to him taunting him of their victory. Ögedei personally vowed to conquer the Jin and went to Yingzhou, where for nine days he prayed to the Heavens for victory. He also called back Subutai from the Russian front to help on the campaign.

In 1231, Ögedei and his forces set out to move further south where they aimed to take the Jin capital, Kaifeng in Henan. Jin generals Wanyan Heda and Yila Pua ordered troops to retreat from Shaanxi and implement a scorched earth policy to hold the fortified Tongguan Pass and block any access to Kaifeng. They calculated that the scorched earth policies would deny the Mongols the ability to sustain a lengthy siege, and their lines of fortifications and difficult terrain would prevent the Mongols from outmaneuvering them. Ögedei's forces had up to 100,000 men, which included his brother Tolui as well as Subutai. With such a large army and the fact that Shaanxi was already suffering from a severe famine, Ögedei knew with limited time and resources, he had to find a way through Tongguan quickly.

== Battle ==
Initial attempts to draw Jin forces out of the fortress failed, so the Mongols decided to find a way to bypass Tongguan entirely. After cutting through the mountainous area of Shangao (present-day Yeoncheon County), the Mongols advanced to the Daohuigu, but were repulsed by Wanyan Heda, who had detected the Mongols' movement, and suffered a heavy defeat, losing more than 10,000 soldiers and tens of thousands of horses (First Battle of Daohuigu).

However, the Mongolian army had not given up on breaking through Tongguan, and in January 1231, Subutai advanced again to Daohuigu. He then sacked the county towns of Lushi and Zhuyang (both in west Henan). It looked like Subutai's forces had successfully outflanked Tongguan by passing through mountains, but his troops were spread out far too wide over a very large distance. General nahemai of Tongguan prevented the invasion of Subutai, and at the same time, requested relief from his friends in the surrounding areas. In response to the request, Wanyan Chenheshang arrived with 1,000 Zhongxiao troops as well as 10,000 regular troops. The cavalry forces of Chenheshang once again defeated the Mongol troops and drove them back(Second Battle of Daohuigu). It was reported that Subutai's forces suffered heavy losses during this battle.

== Aftermath ==
Defeated at Tongguan, the Mongol armies turned to sieging Shaanxi's major cities. They conquered Fengxiang by concentrating 400 trebuchets at a corner of the wall. However, as the province had heavy famine, this did not help much with resupplying the large Mongol army and the main objective of getting past Tongguan was still not achieved. Seeing the difficult situation they were in, the Mongol commanders withdrew back to Inner Mongolia to come up with a new strategy while the army moved northwest to the former Jin-Xia borders to seek provisions and await orders.

Ögedei blamed Subutai for the defeat and berated him. However, Tolui stepped in to defend Subutai, stating: "For a military man, victory and defeat are unpredictable. Please allow him to establish merit and make this up himself." It was noted from some sources that Ögedei would rather blame his generals than admit errors in his strategy. Ögedei was noted to have said during the siege of Fengxiang: "If Muqali were alive, I would not have had to come here myself!"

This was the third and final victory achieved by the Jin Dynasty against the Mongol Empire due to Wanyan Chenheshang. However, Jin fortunes came to an end in the following year at the Battle of Sanfengshan. This time, thanks to the planning of Tolu, Subutai was able to outmaneuver Jin forces. As a result of the battle, the top generals, Wanyan Heda, Yila Pua, and Wanyan Chenheshang, all perished and resulted in the Jin having no more capacity to resist the Mongols.

== Sources ==
- Atwood, Christopher P. (2015). "Pu'a's Boast and Doqolqu's Death: Historiography of a Hidden Scandal in the Mongol Conquest of the Jin". Journal of Song-Yuan Studies. 45: 239–278. ISSN 1059-3152. JSTOR 44511263.
- JIN, Yijiu (9 January 2017). Islam. BRILL. ISBN 978-90-474-2800-8.
- 石, 堅軍 (2010). "1227～1231年蒙金關河爭奪戰初探". 內蒙古社會科學(漢文版). 31: 53–57. ISSN 1003-5281.
