= Sochigel =

Stepmother of Chinggis Khan

Sochigel (Modern Mongolian: Сочигэл, Russian: Сочихэл, Chinese (Simplifed): 速赤格勒) was either a junior wife or concubine of Yesügei, the chief of the Khamag Mongol confederation and father of Genghis Khan. Sochigel's children were Ghengis Khan's half-siblings, and included Behter and Belgutei; the latter became one of Genghis Khan's advisors.

== Biography ==
Little is known about Sochigel's early life until she either married or became a concubine of Yesügei. According to anthropologist Jack Weatherford, Sochigel was already established in Yesügei's household prior to the arrival of Hö'elün, whom he had abducted from her fiancé. However, Hö'elün was quickly made his chief wife, which meant that her children, rather than Sochigel's would become his heirs. Hö'elün's children included Temujin - the future Genghis Khan, Qasar, Khachiun and daughter Temülün.

In 1171 Yesügei died and his followers abandoned Sochigel, Hö'elün and their children, driving them out of their homes and driving away all their cattle. For several years, the widows with their children lived in complete poverty, wandered the steppes, feeding on roots, game and fish. Under these conditions, the children did not get along with each other, which led to the murder of Behter by his half-brothers Genghis Khan and Qasar, after he and Belgutei stole a fish from them.

The impact of Yesügei's abduction of Hö'elün years before continued to affect the families. In circa 1184, three hundred Merkit soldiers attacked their camp and Sochigel, Temujin's fiancée Börte, and a maid, Khoakhchin, were captured as revenge. Temujin gathered a force together in order to rescue Börte in particular; when all the women were found, Sochigel refused to return with them, fleeing into the taiga. Her son Belgutei was angered by her action and punished the Merkit people by ordering the killing of all the warriors who undertook the raid and confiscated their wives and daughters, forcing them to become concubines or maids.

Unlike Hö'elün, Sochigel's name is not mentioned in The Secret History of the Mongols. Unorthodox ethnologist Lev Gumilyov believed that Sochigel did not return with Temujin because she had betrayed him and the rest of the family. Gumilyov believed that Sochigel had assisted the Merkits and enabled them to find the camp, as well as preferred her new Merkit husband.
