= Temülün =

Sister of Genghis Khan

- Born: c. 1171 AD; Khentii Mountains
- Died: unknown
- Parents: Yesügei (father); Hö'elün (mother)

Temülün (Mongolian: Тэмүлүн, c. 1171–?) was the youngest full sibling and only sister of Genghis Khan (born Temüjin), the famed founder and Great Khan of the Mongol Empire. Her parents were Yesügei, chief of the Borjigin clan in the Khamag Mongol confederation, and his second wife Hö'elün. She was nine years younger than Temüjin.

== Biography ==
=== Early life ===
Temülün's name, like her brother's, comes from the stem temü or temür, meaning "iron." The suffix -lun is a common feminine name ending.

The Secret History of the Mongols, a chronicle of Mongol history, mentions Temülün three times: in an account of Temüjin's legendary birth and twice in an episode wherein an infant Temülün and her family are attacked by the Taychiud tribe.

Temülün's father Yesügei died in a Tatar attack when she was a baby, leaving the rest of the family to be raised by Hö'elün.

She had six older brothers: Temüjin, Qasar, Hachiun, Temüge, Behter, and Belgütei (the latter two were her half-siblings).
