= Jahangir Mirza (disambiguation) =

Jahangir Mirza was a Dughlat prince.

Jahangir Mirza may also refer to:

- Jahangir Mirza (cricketer)
- Jahangir Mirza (Timurid Prince)
- Jahangir Mirza II
- Jahangir Mirza Qajar
