= Esen Buqa =

Esen Buqa may refer to:

- Esen Buqa I, Khan of the Chagatai Khanate
- Esen Buqa II, Khan of Moghulistan
