= Behter =

Half-brother of Genghis Khan

Behter or Bekter (Mongolian: Бэхтэр; died 1180) was the son of the Mongol chieftain Yesugei and a junior wife named Sochigel or Suchigu in some sources and Ko'agjin in others. He was also a half-brother of Genghis Khan, then known as Temujin. On the death of Yesugei, Temujin, his mother Hoelun, his siblings and two half-brothers (including Behter, Belgutei and their mother Sochigel) were abandoned by their tribe and left to fend for themselves. Living off the land, they managed to survive. However, the older half-brothers deprived 14-year-old Temujin and his brother Qasar of their spoils. Temujin and Qasar stalked and killed Behter, for which they were scolded by their mother Hoelun.

== Ancestry ==
Yesugei Baghatur	Hoelun
Belgutei	Behter	Qasar	Hachiun	Temüge	Temüjin (Genghis Khan)	Börte
Jochi	Chagatai	Ögedei	Tolui
