= Battle of Sanfengshan =

Battle in 1232 in China

Battle of Sanfeng Mountain
- Part of the Mongol–Jin War
Date	February 9, 1232
Location	Sanfeng Mountain, Jin China (southwest of present-day Yuzhou, Henan Province, China)
Result	Mongol victory
Territorial changes	North China added to the Mongol Empire

Belligerents
Mongol Empire	Jin dynasty

Commanders and leaders
Tolui	Wanyan Heda †; Wanyan Chenheshang †

Strength
40,000–75,000	150,000

Casualties and losses
Heavy	Very heavy

Battle of Sanfengshan
- Simplified Chinese: 三峰山战役
Transcriptions
Standard Mandarin
- Hanyu Pinyin: Sān fēngshān Zhànyì

The Battle of Sanfengshan (Chinese: 三峰山战役; pinyin: Sān fēngshān Zhànyì, lit. 'Battle of the Three-Peak Mountain') was a major decisive battle fought between the Mongol Empire and Jin China during the Mongol conquest of the Jin dynasty. The battle was fought in 9 February 1232 at Sanfeng Mountain, southwest of the current city of Yuzhou in Henan Province, China. The battle resulted with a crushing Mongol victory, successfully planned and orchestrated by their general Tolui, brother of Ögedei Khan and son of Genghis Khan. The battle wiped out the last field army of the Jin Dynasty, therefore sealing its fate of falling to the Mongol Empire.

== Background ==
=== State of the Khanate and conflict with the Jin ===
Historian Christopher Atwood argues the Battle of Sanfengshan was a pivotal point in the history of the Mongolian empire. Following the death of Genghis Khan in 1227, it was an open question whether his son, Ögedei Khan, elected as a successor after a two-year-long dispute with his brothers, would be able to maintain the empire thriving. The Mongols' longtime enemies to the south, the Jin, still held strongholds in Henan which Genghis couldn't conquer before his death; and, to make matters worse, the Mongols suffered a string of unprecedented losses to the Jin in 1230, which further cast doubt on the survivability of the regime.

In particular, the Battle of Dachangyuan, which saw 8 thousand Mongol soldiers lose to 400 Jin men, was described as "the greatest victory the Jin army had seen in 20 years" of war against the Mongols. The Jin army then released a captured Mongol messenger to return to Ögedei with a declaration: "We've got all our soldiers and horses ready, come on over and fight!" (Chinese: 我已準備軍馬，可戰鬭來; pinyin: Wǒ yǐ zhǔnbèi jūnmǎ, kě zhàn dòu lái). This was humiliating to Ögedei Khan, who dismissed the general responsible for the defeat, Doqolqu, and made the decision to personally participate in the next attacks against the Jin. The loss by Doqolqu in the Battle of Dachangyuan was sanitized in Mongol records as a minor defeat, but Ögedei's final list of regrets in Secret History of the Mongols suggests the khan later had the general secretly killed.

The Battle of Dachangyuan was followed by two other defeats for the Mongols, resulting in thousands of men and several tens of thousands of horses lost. Ögedei, now participating in the army, is said to have prayed for nine days for a victory against the Jin upon reaching Ying County.

After the multiple losses, the Mongols turned to sieging Fengxiangfu. During the siege, Ögedei purportedly recounted stories of his father's general, Muqali's, victories, concluding by saying: "If Muqali were alive, I would not have had to come here myself". The city fell in May 1231, with recounts of 400 trebuchets firing at a single corner of the city walls. Due to a recent famine in the region, gathering supplies for the Mongol troops had proved difficult; sustaining them there further was not viable, so they retreated to Inner Mongolia for the summer.

=== The new attack plan ===
During the summer retreat, veteran Mongol general Subutai, alongside Ögedei's brother and army general Tolui, proposed the troops follow a plan that had been allegedly laid out in Genghis Khan's will: to avoid going to the Jin capital of Kaifeng through the usual route of Tong Pass, deemed impassable due to Jin control, and instead redirecting south through Song territory in the mountains, counting on the good will of the Song seeing a common enemy in the Jin. If they managed to reach Kaifeng, it would force the Jin's hand to hurriedly recall the troops at Tong Pass who, by the time they arrived, would likely be tired and easily defeated. Even if not, it would have opened the Pass, allowing for more Mongol troops to get to Kaifeng.

This would be no easy feat; writer Carl Sverdrup compares it to Germany going through Belgium in 1940 to attack France, but if Germany had instead chosen to go through the much more mountainous Switzerland. However, a Chinese man captured during the Fengxiangfu siege had provided details on a possible route to follow.

The Mongol troops were to be split into three or four fronts, with Tolui and Subutai's column going through Song territory; the groups' leaders agreed to rendezvous at Kaifeng in early 1232.

=== The march of Tolui's column ===
A Mongol envoy was sent south to request safe passage through Song territory, but the messenger went missing and no agreement was made; the front had no option but to pass through Song territory without permission, and thus faced multiple battles along the way. Moreover, Tolui's troops had had to survive on very little resources for most of the year, prior to the summer retreat, in part due to the siege of Fengxiangfu – soldiers reportedly had resorted to eating dry grass and human flesh to survive – so morale couldn't have been high. Still, the conflicts with the Song were exploited by the Mongols as a way to replenish their resources.

The Jin, meanwhile, were working with limited information on the Mongols' position; they had been made aware of the approach of Tolui's troops to the southwest, but not what exact path they would take. By December 1231, Jin commander Wanyan Heda had moved thousands of troops to Shanyang, at the foot of Wuduo Mountain, to set up an ambush. The Mongols, however, were approaching from much further south, near Guanghua, crossing the Han River in January 1232. Learning of this, the Jin army, led by Heda and Pu'a, marched south to Yushan Mountain to meet them; soon after, the Mongols arrived, and both sides prepared for battle. The armies clashed, to a minor Jin victory and Mongol retreat.

The Jin retreated their troops to Dengzhou for food, a move which allowed Tolui's column, by a combination of dispersing and marching at night time, to pass them and head for Kaifeng.

== Battle ==
Sanfeng Mountain as seen from the ISS in November 2004

In early February 1232, Jin general Heda received a message from the Jin Court, 11 days after it was sent, ordering him to accelerate his march towards the capital, as Ögedei Khan and his troops had managed to cross the Yellow River. This was a blow to the confidence of the Jin army, especially Pu'a, who were not expecting a second Mongol front already so close to Kaifeng to deal with.

Heda then sent Wanyan Chenheshang forward to occupy Sanfeng Mountain. (Note: Sverdrup: "a hill, or three connected hills, rather than a mountain".) Mongol troops later arrived from the southwest, alongside some thousands of men in reinforcements sent by Ögedei's column to the northeast; they joined forces to the east of Sanfeng Mountain. Ögedei's reinforcements also brought with them food replenishments, in another blow to the Jin, who had spent days rushing to arrive before Tolui's men, and as such were fatigued and lacking food. Still, the Mongols were severely outnumbered for the battle: Tolui's troops numbered 20 to 40 thousand men, while Jin armies numbered 100 to 200 thousand men.

In Ata-Malik Juvayni's 13th century historical account, The History of the World Conqueror, this is the point at which a weather stone (jadamishi) (Note: As described in the 14th century book The Compendium of Chronicles: "Jadamishi is a tactic as follows. There are several stones of various types that have the property, when they are taken out and washed in water, of producing immediately—even in the heart of summer—wind, cold, snow, rain, and hail.") was used to change the tides of the battle:

Amongst the Mongols was a Kangly who was well versed in the science of yai [jadamishi], that is the use of the rain-stone. [Tolui] commanded him to begin practising his art and ordered the whole army to put on raincoats over their winter clothes and not to dismount from their horses for three days and three nights. The [Kangly] busied himself with his yai so that it began to rain behind the Mongols, and on the last day the rain was changed to snow, to which was added a cold wind.

Due to the snowstorm, clashes between the armies were interrupted; the Jin troops set up camp on the base of the mountain, while the Mongols spread out and sought refuge in various villages in the area. Having camped out in the open during the snowstorm, the Jin were in a precarious position; and, as part of a common war tactic by the Mongol army, an escape route for the enemy, this time in the form of a road leading north sitting between the Jin and the Mongol troops, was left seemingly unguarded.

In the morning of 9 February 1232, the Jin army, tired, freezing and hungry, retreated following the road, undoubtedly vigilant for an attack coming from behind. A Mongol group with Alchidai had been hiding to the northwest, and struck them in a surprise attack. This caused the Jin army's structure to fall apart and become "like a flock of sheep", allowing for the rest of the Mongol army to finish them off.

=== Historicity of the jadamishi ===
Historian Anıl Oğuz points out Mongols' recount of this event extends the previously established function of a jadamishi in the Mongol canon, which until then was only said to summon rain and thunderstorms.

Additionally, since this was a Mongol victory, it was in their interest to portray the sudden weather change, which was by all counts a deciding factor in the battle, as a strategic maneuver; Chinese chroniclers, on the other hand, would rather attribute the loss to random weather conditions. Subutai's biography in the Chinese 14th century historical compilation of the History of Yuan describes the battle, but omits mentions of a weather stone:

The armies met at Sanfeng Mountain and the Jin armies enveloped them several ranks deep. At that moment a great snow storm arose and the Jin soldiers were all frozen stiff. The [Mongol] armies seized the opportunity and slaughtered them until almost none were left. From this time on, the Jin armies were unable to revive.

== Aftermath ==
In some sources, prior to the battle, the Jin army had provoked the Mongols by threatening to take them prisoner and rape their women. After the Mongol victory, remaining Jin soldiers were purportedly sodomized in revenge.

=== Fall of the Jin dinasty ===
Ögedei and Tolui's troops later met on their way to Kaifeng, and Ögedei praised his brother's success. With most of the Jin army defeated, Ögedei and Tolui left the taking of Kaifeng to general Subutai, and returned northwards alongside most of their troops to rest. Kaifeng was taken a year later, and the Jin dynasty was toppled in February 1234.

=== Consequences for the Khanate ===
The success of the battle restored the prestige of the Mongol army, solidifying Genghis' sons as worthy heirs and capable of maintaining the Mongol empire's status as a regional power. Tolui's fortuitous success in the battle, however, cast doubts into the empire's decision of enthroning Ögedei instead of him a few years prior. Tolui had faced the challenges of unauthorized traversal through risky Song territory into a heavily outnumbered conflict with the Jin; had shown his resourcefulness in keeping a famished army together and motivated, and in successfully using witchcraft to his advantage in the form of the jadamishi; all while fulfilling the revered Genghis' last wishes on how to defeat the Jin.

A few months after the battle, around June 1232, Ögedei Khan is said to have fallen ill, supposedly from the work of vengeful Jin spirits. Tolui then allegedly offers his life in place of his brother's, and drinks something brewed by shamans caring for Ögedei; Ögedei recovers and Tolui later dies. It has been suggested that Ögedei, or someone close to him, had Tolui poisoned, preventing his successes in war leading him to replace the Khan. Atwood, however, argues the months it took until Tolui's passing (which would've happened around September 1232) may indicate Tolui's death was attributable to an alcohol-related condition, such as cirrhosis, and that recounting the events in this way was an intentional device by the writer, who wanted to show the fitness of the family to rule.

== In popular culture ==
- The Battle of Sanfengshan is portrayed in the Japanese manga and anime series A Witch's Life in Mongol, (Note: Manga vol.3 ch.18, anime S01E09) associating the snowstorm to jadamishi usage, as in the Mongol recounts.
