= Shi Tianze =

Chinese politician and general

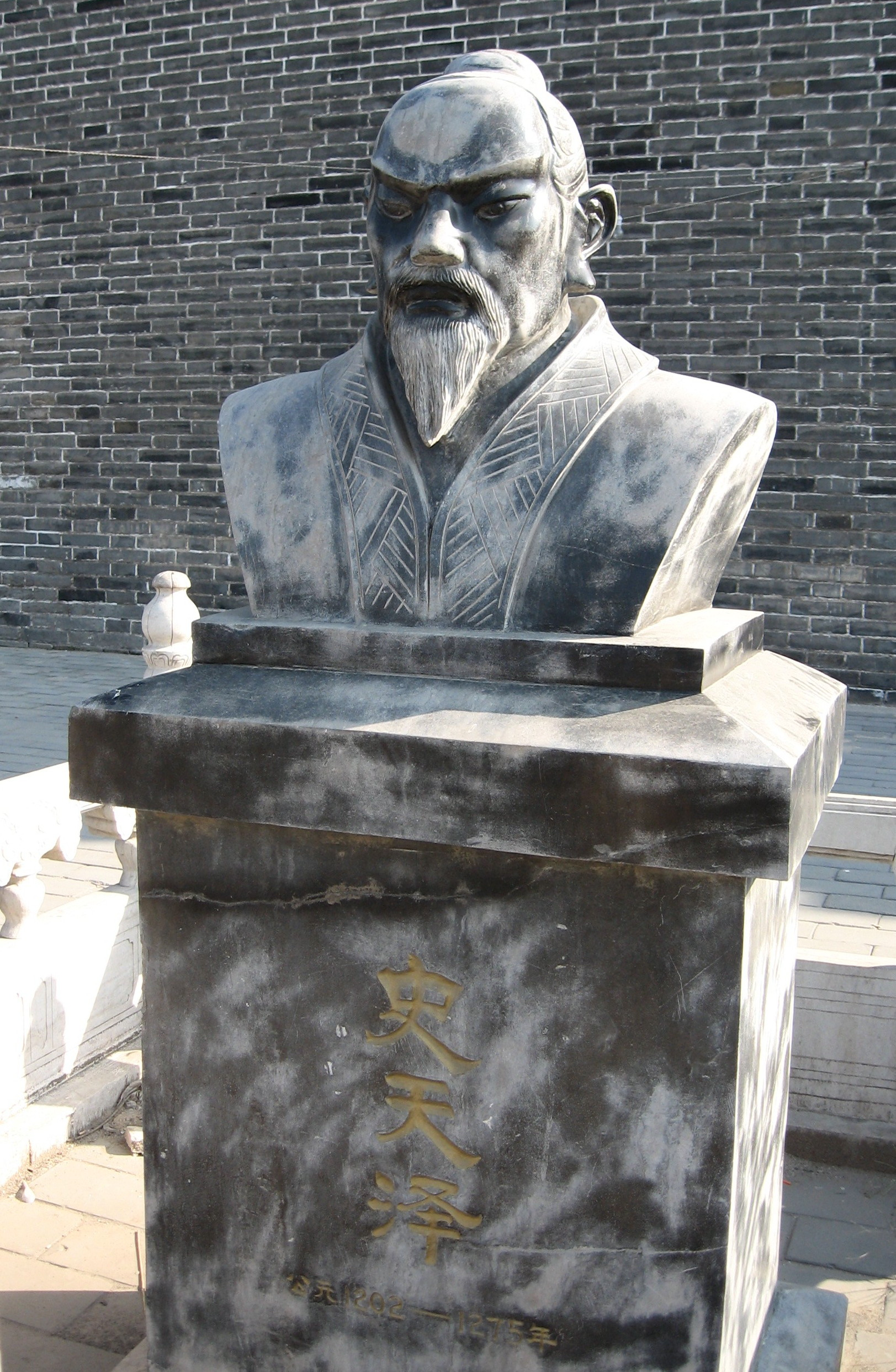
Statue of Shi Tianze in Zhengding, Hebei, China

Shi Tianze (Chinese: 史天澤; pinyin: Shǐ Tiānzé; Wade–Giles: Shih T'ien-tse; 1202 – 5 March 1275), courtesy name Runfu (潤甫), posthumous name Prince Zhongwu of Zhenyang (鎮陽忠武王), was a general and official of the Mongol Empire and the Yuan dynasty. He was subsequently promoted to the post of Right Grand Chancellor of the Secretariat and became the first ethnic Han Grand Chancellor of the Yuan dynasty. He played a key role in early Yuan politics.

== Name ==
Shi Tianze is also mentioned under the name Samka ba'tur (Persian: سمکه بهادر) in Persian historical sources such as the Jami' al-tawarikh. This name is derived from the Chinese word "三哥 (sangge)," meaning "third son".

== Life ==
Shi Tianze was an ethnic Han who lived in the Jin dynasty. Interethnic marriage between Han and Jurchen became common at this time. His father was Shi Bingzhi (Shih Ping-chih, 史秉直). Shi Bingzhi was married to a Jurchen woman (surname Na-ho) and a Han woman (surname Chang), it is unknown which of them was Shi Tianze's mother.

Shi Tianze married two Jurchen women, a Han woman, and a Korean woman, and his son Shi Gang was born to one of his Jurchen wives. His Jurchen wives's surnames were Mo-nien and Na-ho, his Korean wife's surname was Li, and his Han wife's surname was Shi.

Shi Tianze defected to the Mongol Empire's forces upon their invasion of the Jin dynasty. Shi, Zhang Rou (Chang Jou) zh, and Yan Shi (Yen Shih) zh and other high ranking Han who served in the Jin dynasty and defected to the Mongols helped build the structure for the administration of the new state.

== Family of Shi Tianze ==
nameless
Shi lun 史倫	nameless	nameless	nameless
Shi chenggui 史成珪	nameless	nameless
Shi jindao 史進道	Shi bǐngzhí 史秉直	Shi huaide 史懐徳	nameless
Shi tianze 史天沢	Shi tianan 史天安	Shi tianni 史天倪	Shi tianxiang 史天祥	Shi tianrui 史天瑞
Shi ge 史格	Shi shu 史枢	Shi ji 史楫	Shi quan 史権
Shi yao 史燿

== Sources ==
- Ikeuchi, Isao（池内功） (1984). "The Formation of Khubilai's Power and the Chinese Troops under His Rule." The journal of Oriental researches, Volume 43.
- Thackston, W. M, Classical writings of the medieval Islamic world v.3, (London, 2012)
