= Kebek Sultan =

Khan of eastern Moghulistan (died c. 1472)

Khan of Eastern Moghulistan (Uyghurstan)
- Reign: 1468/69–c. 1472
- Predecessor: Dost Muhammad
- Successor: Yunus Khan
- Died: c. 1472
- House: Chagatai
- Father: Dost Muhammad
- Religion: Islam

Kebek Sultan Oghlan (کیباک سلطان اغلان; died c. 1472) was Khan of eastern Moghulistan, the region known as Uyghurstan, from 1468 or 1469 until his death. A member of the Chagatai dynasty, he was the son of Dost Muhammad and a grandson of Esen Buqa II. His reign was brief, ending when he was betrayed and killed by his own followers.

== Background ==
Esen Buqa II, Khan of Moghulistan, died in 1462, and the khanate split between his brother Yunus Khan and his son Dost Muhammad. Dost Muhammad held the eastern territories, ruling from Aksu over the region of Uyghurstan, while Yunus Khan controlled the western portion of the khanate.

== Reign ==
Dost Muhammad died of illness in AH 877 (1468 or 1469 CE). Kebek Sultan was a child at the time, and a group of his father's supporters carried him east to Turpan. Yunus Khan seized Aksu and the western portions of Dost Muhammad's former territory. Kebek Sultan ruled from Turpan for several years as the last representative of the eastern line of Moghul khans.

== Death ==
Around 1472, Kebek Sultan was betrayed by his own followers, who killed him and brought his head to Yunus Khan. Yunus Khan reacted with anger at the murder of his great-nephew and had those responsible put to death. Eastern Moghulistan then passed under Yunus Khan's authority, reuniting the khanate. The region around Turpan later became the seat of the Turpan Khanate, established in 1487 by Yunus Khan's son Ahmad Alaq.

Preceded by Dost Muhammad	Moghul Khan (in Uyghurstan); 1468/9–c. 1472	Succeeded by Yunus Khan
