= Rei Kikukawa =

Japanese actress and television presenter

- 菊川 怜
- Born: February 28, 1978 (age 48); Urawa, Saitama, Japan
- Education: University of Tokyo
- Occupations: Actress; Television presenter
- Years active: 1999–present
- Agent: Oscar Promotion
- Spouse: Yoshiteru Akita (m. 2017; div. 2024)
- Children: 3
- Relatives: Mai Kikukawa (sister)

Rei Kikukawa (菊川 怜, Kikukawa Rei; born February 28, 1978) is a Japanese actress and television presenter.

== Biography ==
Kikukawa was born in Urawa (now part of Saitama), in Saitama Prefecture. She is a graduate of the University of Tokyo where she majored in architecture. She was scouted by an agent while shopping, and eventually came to be represented by Oscar Promotion. Her first major role came in 2002 when she was chosen to co-host the Sunday night NTV show Bankisha.

== Personal life ==
On April 28, 2017, Kikukawa announced via television broadcast that she had married a non-celebrity man, who was later revealed to be the businessman Yoshiteru Akita. The couple shares three children together: their first child, a son born in April 2019, their second son in December 2020, and their third, a daughter born in October 2022, respectively.

Kikukawa announced through a post on her official social media account that she and Akita had finalized their divorce on November 6, 2024. She shares custody of their three children and co-parent.

== Filmography ==
=== Movies ===
- Double Deception (2001)
- Gun Crazy 2: Beyond the Law (2002)
- Godzilla: Final Wars (2004)
- Install (2004)
- Genghis Khan: To the Ends of the Earth and Sea (2007)
- Sakura no Sono/The Cherry Orchard (2008)
- Meon (2010)
- Ōoku (2010)
- A Sower of Seeds 5 (2025)

=== Television ===
- OL Zenido (2003 TV Asahi)
- Yume miru Budo: Hon o yomu Onna (2003 NHK)
- Shinsengumi! (2004 NHK), Ikumatsu
- Reikan Bus Guide Jikenbo / Midnight Ghost Tour (2004 TV Asahi)
- Chakushin Ari / One Missed Call (2005 TV Asahi)
- Izumo no Okuni (2006 NHK)
- Hoshizora Hospital / Starry Skay Hospital (2007 NHK)
- Dageki Tenshi Ruri / Blow Angel Ruri (2008 TV Asahi)
- Midori no Christmas / Green Christmas (2002 NHK)
- Sinmai Jiken Kisha Misaki / Journalist Misaki (2005, 2006 TV Tokyo)
- Quartet: June Bride 2005 (2005 NTV)
- Kuroi Jukai / Black Sea of Trees (2005 Fuji TV)
- Women in Wall: Utsunomiya Women's Prison 2006 (2006 NTV)
- Aoi Byoten (2006 Fuji TV)
- Midnight Blue: Tokyo Metropolitan Police Department-Identification Section (2006 NTV)
- Satsujin Yuki Oku no Hosomichi (2007 Fuji TV)
- Detective Teacher Miss Saionji Rika's Homicide Notebook (2008 TBS)
- Keishicho Denwa Shidokan: Miss Hukagawa Mariko's Police blotter (2008 TV Asahi)
- Onsen Nakai Koizumi Atuko no Jikencho (2009 TV Tokyo)
- Sankyo no Sho (2010 Fuji TV)
- Tokudane! (Fuji TV)
