= Saniz Mirza =

Dughlat amir

Saqsiz Mirza (died 1464/65) was the Dughlat amir of Yarkand from 1457/58 until his death. He was the elder of two sons of Amir Sayyid Ali.

== Life ==
Saqsiz Mirza succeeded his father upon his death in 1457 or 1458. Choosing to establish himself in Yarkand, he gave Kashgar and Yengisar to his brother Muhammad Haidar Mirza and the latter's mother Urun Sultan Khanim.

As a supporter of the Moghul khan Yunus Khan, he soon came into conflict with his brother, who supported Yunus' rival Dost Muhammad Khan. As a result, Muhammad Haidar fled to Aksu, which was under the control of Dost Muhammad, while Saqsiz regained control of Kashgar.

In 1464 or 1465, he was wounded in a hunting accident. He soon died of his wounds; upon his death Dost Muhammad came down to Yarkand and demanded Saniz Mirza's widow named Jamal Agha, whom he married upon her surrender. He also received the latter's children (sons, Mirza Abu Bakr and Omar Mirza, and daughter Khan Sultan Khanum), whom he brought back with him to Aksu.

The Dughlat historian Mirza Muhammad Haidar characterized Saniz Mirza as a "violent, but generous man".
