= Jahangir Mirza =

- Dughlat prince
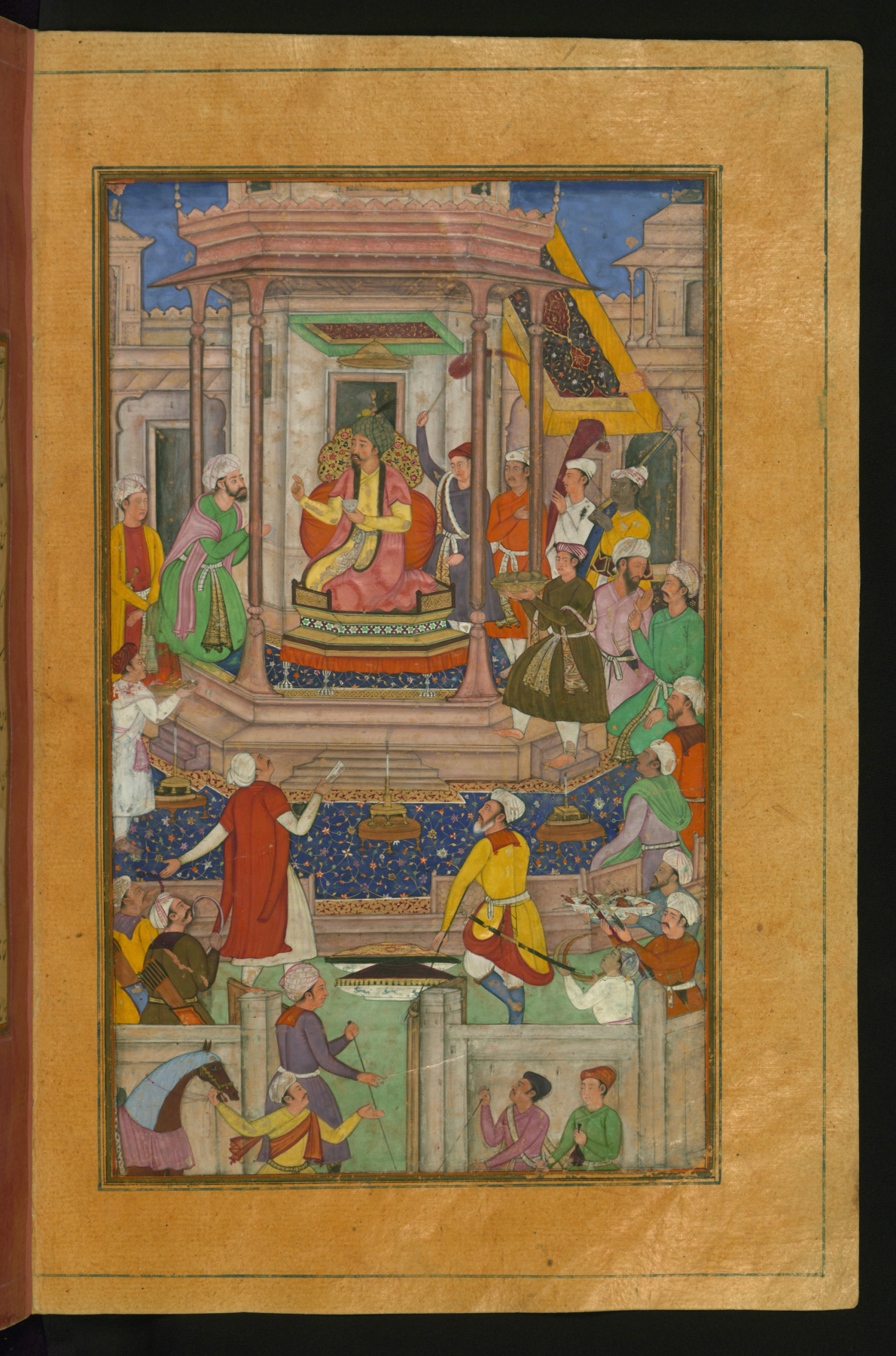
- Babur being entertained in Ghaznī by Jahāngīr Mīrzā
- Born: circa 1472
- Died: 1515 (aged 42–43); Yangi Hissar
- Spouse: Khadija Sultan Khanim (4th daughter of Ahmad Alaq)
- Mother: a daughter of Isan Bugha Khan

Jahangir Mirza (c. 1472 – c. 1515) was a Dughlat prince and briefly the ruler of Yarkand (1514). He was the eldest son of Mirza Abu Bakr Dughlat.

== Biography ==
During his father's reign as ruler of the cities of Yarkand, Kashgar and Khotan, Jahangir did not play a major role in the government. The only event recorded of him during this time is his marriage to Khadija Sultan Khanim, the youngest daughter of Ahmad Khan. She was captured by Abu Bakr during the attack on Aksu.

Mirza Aba Bakr's reign was brought to an end in 1514 when Sultan Said Khan invaded Kashgaria. Judging his army to be incapable of putting up an effective resistance, he handed over Yarkand to Jahangir Mirza and promptly headed south for Khotan. Jahangir Mirza, however, having been suddenly thrust into his position with little experience to aid him, decided that maintaining his position in the face of Sultan Said Khan's army would be impossible. Five days after the departure of his father, he destroyed his treasures and allowed the citizens of Yarkand to pillage what they pleased so that it wouldn't fall into the hands of the khan. He then retreated to Sanju in what is modern day Pishan County.

When Sultan Said Khan's forces arrived, he surrendered without a fight and disavowed his father. Seeing that Jahangir Mirza had disavowed his father and had treated his marriage with Khadija Sultan Khanim with honor, Sultan Said Khan pardoned him and celebrated the occasion with a feast. That winter, however, Jahangir Mirza was murdered in Yangi Hissar. The identity and motives of the assassins were unknown.
