= Yesugei =

Father of Genghis Khan (c. 1134–1171)

Yesugei Bagatur ᠶᠢᠰᠦᠭᠡᠢ ᠪᠠᠭᠠᠲᠤᠷ

De facto ruler of Khamag Mongol
- Reign: c. 1160 – 1171
- Predecessor: Hotula Khan
- Successor: Genghis Khan
- Born: c. 1134; Mongolian Plateau
- Died: c. 1171 (aged 36–37); Mongolian Plateau
- Spouse: Hö'elün; Sochigel
- Issue: Genghis Khan; Qasar; Hachiun; Temüge; Temülün; Belgutei; Behter
Names
- Yesugei
Posthumous name
- Emperor Shényuán (神元皇帝)
Temple name
- Liezu (烈祖)
- House: Borjigin
- Father: Bartan Bagatur
- Mother: Aicigel
- Religion: Tengrism

Yesugei (Note: Chinese: 也速該; pinyin: Yěsùgāi) or Yesükhei Baghatur (Note: Mongolian: ᠶᠢᠰᠦᠭᠡᠢ ᠪᠠᠭᠠᠲᠤᠷ, cyrillized: Есүхэй баатар, pronounced [jesykʰei̯ b̥aɢatʰur]) (c. 1134–1171) was a major chief of the Khamag Mongol confederation and the father of Temüjin, who later became known as Genghis Khan. Yesügei was from the Borjigin family, and his name means "like nine", meaning he had the auspicious qualities of the number nine, a lucky number to the Mongols.

== Life ==
Yesügei was the son of Bartan Baghatur, who was the second son of Khabul Khan. Khabul was recognized as a khagan by the Jin Dynasty. Khabul Khan was, in turn, the great-grandson of the Mongol chief Khaidu, the first to try to unite the Mongols. Yesügei abducted his chief wife, Hö'elün, a daughter of the Olkhunut forest people, with the help of his elder brother Negün Taishi and younger brother Daritai Otchigin, from her newlywed husband Chiledu of Merkits. Yesügei abducted Hoelun because of her beauty and indications of fertility.

After the Khamag Mongol confederation khan Hotula died, the confederation had no elected king, but de facto Yesügei ruled the confederation. Yesügei had a bloodbrother, or anda, Toghrul Khan (later known as Wang Khan and Ong Khan). Yesügei helped Toghrul to defeat his uncle Gurkhan. After Yesügei's death, Toghrul initially helped Temüjin in arranging his marriage to Börte and uniting the tribes but later defected to Genghis' anda and rival, Jamukha.

In 1171 Yesügei died when his son Temüjin was nine years old. The Secret History of the Mongols records that Yesügei left Temüjin at the home of Dai Setsen, a noble man of the Khongirad tribe, after Yesügei and Dai Setsen had agreed that their children, Temüjin and Börte, would marry. When Yesügei was on his way home, he noticed an encampment where some Tatars were having a wedding feast. Yesügei wanted to join the celebration, but he knew he could not reveal his identity, since he was known among the Tatars as the person who killed their relative (called Temüjin Uge) in a battle eight years earlier. The Secret History of the Mongols records that Temüjin was named after Temüjin Uge in commemoration of this victory. Yesügei tried his luck, but the Tatars recognized him and poisoned his food. Although ill, Yesügei managed to escape back to his family's camp.

Yesügei died three days later at home.

== Legacy ==
During the reign of the Yuan dynasty, he was given the temple name of Liezu (Chinese: 烈祖; lit. 'Ardent Founder') and the posthumous name Shenyuan Huangdi (Chinese: 神元皇帝; lit. 'Supernaturally Prime Emperor').

== Family ==
Yesügei and Hoelun had four sons Temüjin, (later known as Genghis Khan), Qasar, Hachiun, Temüge and a daughter, Temülün. Yesugei had two sons by his second wife Sochigel: Behter and Belgutei. The Secret History of the Mongols records that in his youth, Temüjin and Qasar ambushed their half brother Behter after he withheld the spoils of hunts from Temüjin and Qasar. Behter pleaded for them to spare his brother Belgutei, who had assisted Behter in withholding the spoils. Temüjin and Qasar shot Behter with arrows but spared Belgutei. Belgutei was close to Temüjin and later became one of his generals.

Hoelun	Yesugei	Sochigel
Börte	Temüjin (Genghis Khan)	Qasar	Hachiun	Temüge	Temülün	Belgutei	Behter
Jochi	Chagatai	Ögedei	Tolui

== See also ==
- Bride kidnapping
- Yesu – several people of that name
- Yesü Möngke
