= Olkhonud =

Clan of Genghis Khan's mother

Olkhonud (Mongolian: Олхуноуд, Олхонууд, Олгонууд; Chinese: 斡勒忽讷; pinyin: wòlēihūnè), also rendered as Olqunuut, was the clan of Hoelun, the mother of Genghis Khan. They helped Genghis to defeat the Naimans. The Olkhunut people were very closely related to the Hongirad tribe. Their descendants still live in Khovd Province of Mongolia and in Inner Mongolia of China.
