= Mirza Abu Bakr Dughlat =

- Dughlat Kashgari
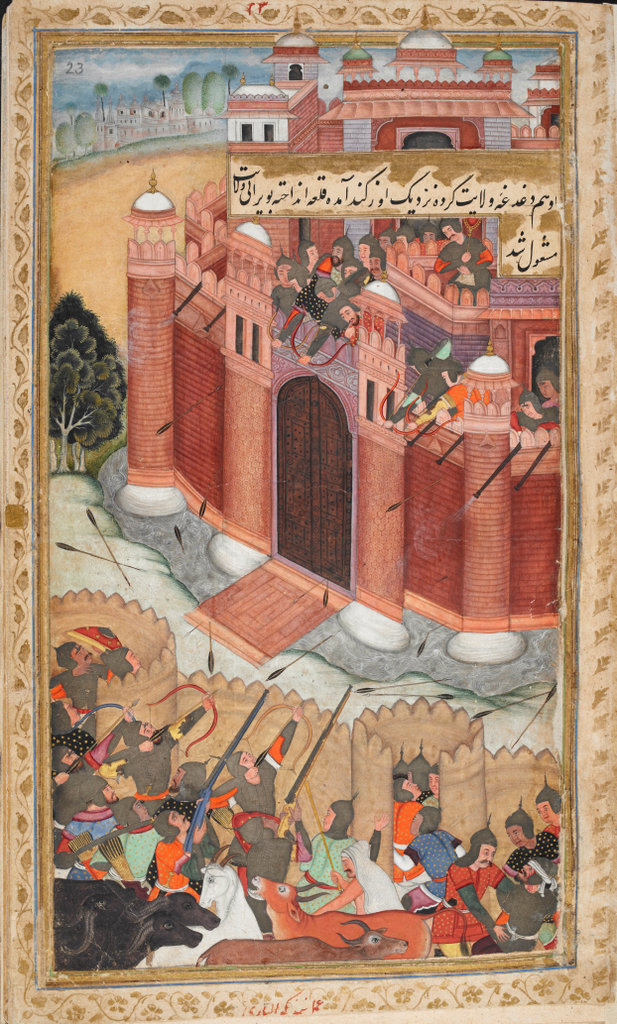
- 1494-Abubekr Duglat attempting unsuccessfully to take Uzgend
- Reign: 1465-1514
- Died: 1514
- Burial: North of Shahidulla
- Religion: Sunni Islam

Mirza Abu Bakr Dughlat (also Ababakar or Abubekr; died shortly after AH Rajab 920 / Aug-Sept 1514; exact date uncertain; year 1516 indicated by some authors is wrong) was a ruler in South-Western part of present Xinjiang Uyghur Autonomous Region of China, an amir of the Dughlat tribe. In the middle of the fifteenth century, in 1465, he founded in Western Kashgaria a kingdom based at Yarkand, a fragment of Moghulistan. It included Khotan and Kashgar; he took Kashgar in 1480. He was the son of Saniz Mirza, son of Mir Sayyid Ali, the latter was amir in Kashgar who regained control of the city by Dughlat dynasty, having expelled Timurid local ruler in 1435.

He successfully resisted the attacks of Yunus Khan, against whom he had rebelled in 1479–80. Ahmad Alaq, son of Yunus Khan, took Kashgar from him in 1499, but could not hold it. Subsequent to retaking Kashgar, Abu Bakr took his forces and successfully conquered number of neighboring areas, including modern day Ladakh, Balur (around Gilgit), Badakhshan, and other fragments of Moghulistan.

In 1514, Sultan Said Khan took Kashgar from him. In danger of losing Yarkand and Khotan as well, he gave the government to his eldest son Jahangir Mirza, and attempted to flee to Ladakh. He was intercepted and killed by pursuers sent by Sultan Said Khan north of Shahidulla.

His deeds are recorded in the Tarikh-i-Rashidi, which was written by his nephew, Mirza Muhammad Haidar.

== Family ==
Consorts

Abu Bakr had two wives:

- Husn Nigar Khanum, daughter of Esen Buqa II;
- Khanzada Begum, daughter of Sultan Mahmud Mirza;

Sons

Abu Bakr had three sons;

- Jahangir Mirza - with Husn Nigar Khanum;
- Turangir Mirza - with Khanzada Begum;
- Bustangir Mirza - with Khanzada Begum;
