= Battle of Dachangyuan =

13th century AD conflict in China

- Part of the Mongol–Jin War
Date	1229
Location	Dachangyuan (Present-day Ning County, Gansu)
Result	Jin victory

Belligerents
Mongol Empire	Jin Dynasty

Commanders and leaders
Chilaun; Doqolqu	Wanyan Heda; Yila Pua; Wanyan Chenheshang

Strength
8,000 soldiers	400 cavalry

The Battle of Dachangyuan (Chinese: 大昌原之戰) took place between the Mongol Empire and the Jin Dynasty in 1229 during the Mongol conquest of the Jin dynasty.

== Background ==
By the year of Genghis Khan's death in 1227, the Mongols had defeated Western Xia and thanks to the efforts of Muqali, they had also taken virtually all the territories north of the Yellow River in China including Zhongdu, the Jin Dynasty capital.

When Ögedei Khan succeeded his father, he continued to launch offensives southwards against the Jin Dynasty where its new capital was now in Kaifeng.

== Battle ==
Around late 1229, the Mongols launched a siege against Qingyang city.

Wanyan Chenheshang was ordered by commanding officer, Yila Pua to help relieve the siege. Chenheshang grew up in a military family and was familiar with both archery and horse-riding.

Chenheshang led the Zhongxiao (Loyalty) army which consisted of various ethnic groups that were attacked by the Mongols. These included other Mongols, Naimans, Uyghurs, Tanguts, Han Chinese and even Kipchaks.

Jin historian and poet, Yuan Haowen wrote that Chenheshang personally led 400 of his elite cavalry to attack 8,000 soldiers in open battle. Due to the bravery and ferocity demonstrated during the attack, they were successful in lifting the siege. Yuan called this the greatest victory that the Jin Dynasty had seen in its 20 years of war with the Mongols.

== Aftermath ==
Before the battle, Jin forces captured a Mongol messenger, Ögölen. After the battle was over, Yila Pua released the messenger and sent him back to Ögedei Khan with the following message: “We’ve got all our soldiers and horses ready - come on over and fight!”.

Ögedei was furious upon hearing the news of defeat and dismissed Doqolqu, the commander in charge from his post. He also called back Subutai from the Russian front to join the campaign against Jin.

== Sources ==
- Atwood, Christopher P. (2015). "Pu'a's Boast and Doqolqu's Death: Historiography of a Hidden Scandal in the Mongol Conquest of the Jin". Journal of Song-Yuan Studies. 45: 239–278. ISSN 1059-3152. JSTOR 44511263.
- JIN, Yijiu (9 January 2017). Islam. BRILL. ISBN 978-90-474-2800-8.
- Connolly, Peter; Gillingham, John; Lazenby, John (13 May 2016). The Hutchinson Dictionary of Ancient and Medieval Warfare. Routledge. ISBN 978-1-135-93674-7.
