= Hö'elün =

Mother of Temüjin (Genghis Khan) (fl. 1162–1210)

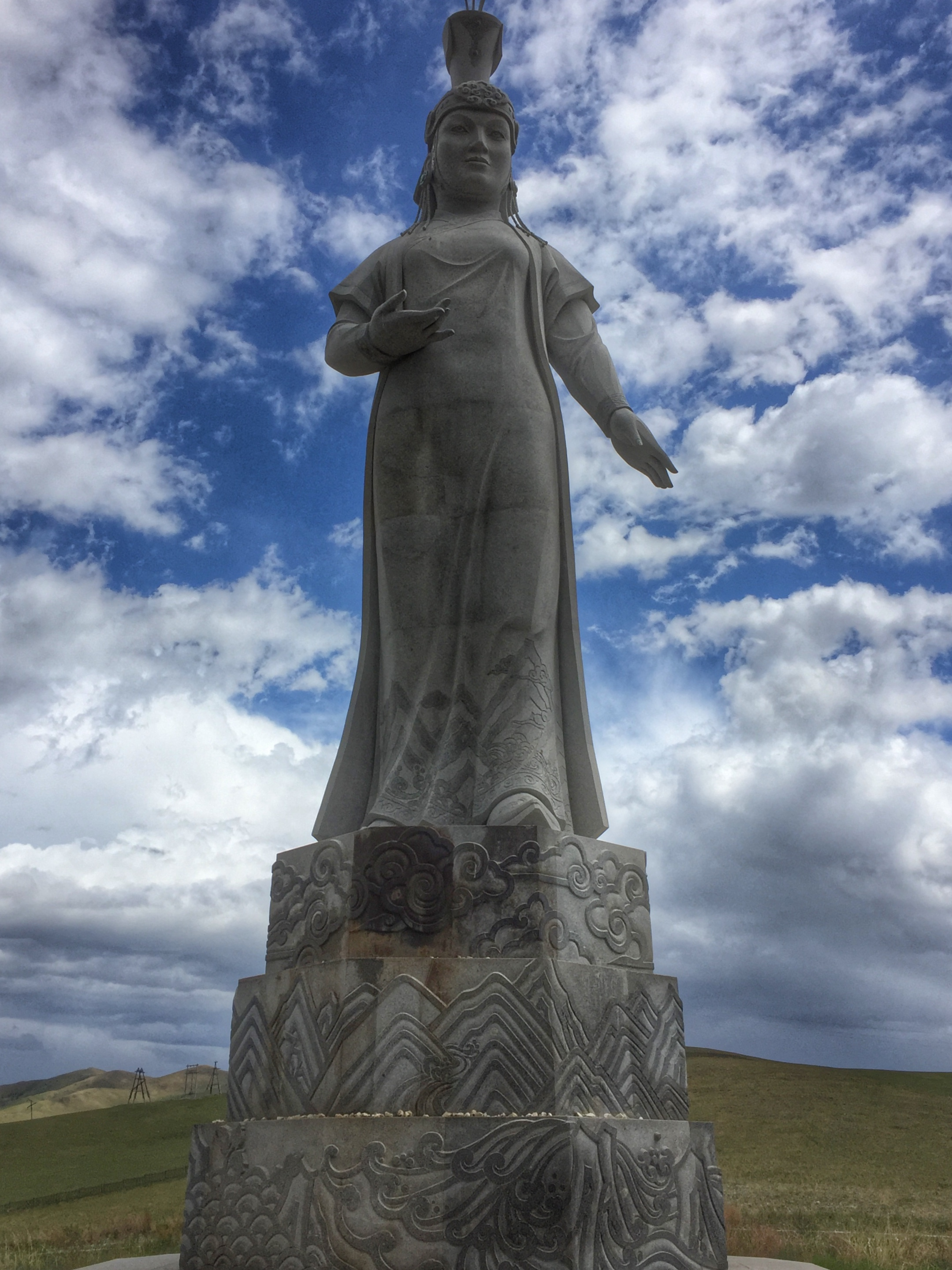
- Statue of Hö'elün located near the equestrian statue of her son at Tsonjin Boldog, Mongolia
- Spouse: Chiledu; Yesügei; Münglig
- Issue: Genghis Khan; Qasar; Hachiun; Temüge; Temülen
Names
- Mongol script: ᠥᠭᠡᠯᠦᠨ ᠦᠵᠢᠨ Ö’elün Üjin; Mongolian Cyrillic: Өэлүн Үжин
Posthumous name
- Empress Xuanyi (宣懿皇后)

Transcription into Chinese characters
- Traditional Chinese: 訶額侖
- Simplified Chinese: 诃额仑
Transcriptions
Standard Mandarin
- Hanyu Pinyin: Hē'élún

Hö'elün (Mongolian: ᠥᠭᠡᠯᠦᠨ ᠦᠵᠢᠨ, Ö’elün Üjin, lit. 'Lady Ö’elün'; fl. 1162–1210) was a noblewoman of the Mongol Empire and the mother of Temüjin, better known as Genghis Khan. She played a major role in his rise to power, as described in the Secret History of the Mongols.

Born into the Olkhonud clan of the Onggirat tribe, Hö'elün was originally married to Chiledu, a Merkit aristocrat; she was captured shortly after her wedding by Yesügei, an important member of the Mongols, who abducted her to be his primary wife. She and Yesügei had four sons and one daughter: Temüjin, Qasar, Hachiun, Temüge, and Temülen. After Yesügei was fatally poisoned and the Mongols abandoned her family, Hö'elün shepherded all her children through poverty to adulthood—her resilience and organisational skills have been remarked upon by historians. She continued to play an important role after Temüjin's marriage to Börte—together, the two women managed his camp and provided him with advice.

Hö'elün married Münglig, an old retainer of Yesügei, in thanks for his support after a damaging defeat in 1187; during the next decades, she arranged marriages and maintained alliances in Yesügei's place. After Temüjin's 1206 entitlement as Genghis Khan, she likely felt she had been under-rewarded for her efforts compared to her husband. She was also heavily involved in disputes between Genghis, his brothers, and Münglig's sons; possibly due to the stress of mediating, she died soon after on an unknown date.

== Name and sources ==
There is no universal romanisation system used for Mongolian; as a result, there are numerous modern spellings for Mongolian names that may result in considerably different pronunciations from the original. The name Hö'elün has thus also been rendered as Ö’elün in English, sometimes suffixed by Üjin, which means "Lady".

Most of what is known of Hö'elün's life is derived from the Secret History of the Mongols, a mid-13th-century epic poem which retold the formation of the Mongol Empire. As this source, through extolling the advice and stability she provided for her children, is very favourable towards Hö'elün, it is probable that its anonymous author had links to her. Although its chronology is often imperfect and it inserts numerous poetic elements into the narrative, the Secret History is regarded as a valuable source because it does not suppress uncomfortable details; this sets it apart from other sources, such as the 14th-century Persian historian Rashid al-Din's Jami al-tawarikh.

== Biography ==
=== Early life and initial marriages ===
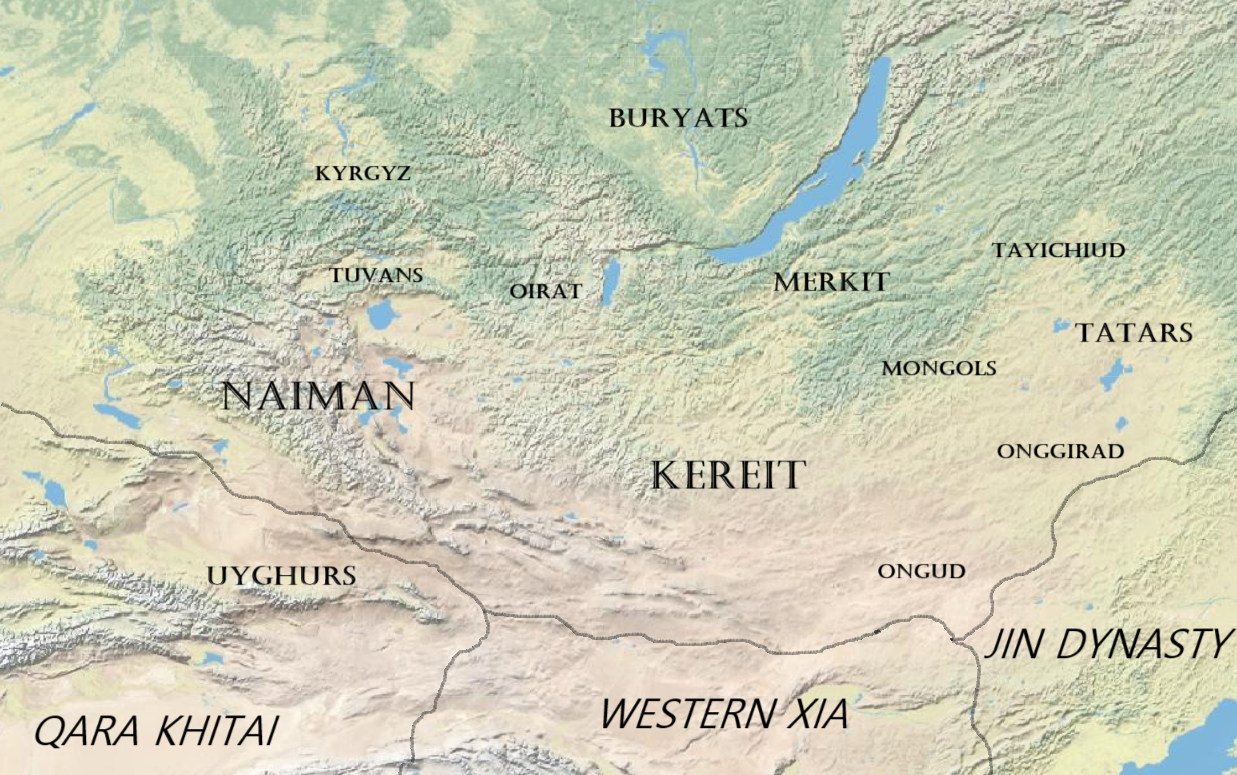
Mongolic tribes c. 1207. The Olkhonud lived in the far east as a clan of the Onggirad; Borjigin Mongols such as Yesügei lived between the Onggirad and the Merkit.

According to the Secret History, Hö'elün was born into the Olkhonud clan of the Onggirad tribe. The Onggirad lived along the Greater Khingan mountain range south of the Ergüne river, in modern-day Inner Mongolia, with the Olkhonud living near the source of the Khalkha River. She grew up to be an attractive woman, and her parents were able to arrange a good marriage for her to Chiledu, the brother of the chief of the Merkit tribe; they were wed in a formal ceremony in Olkhonud lands when Hö'elün was around fifteen years old, in around 1160–1161. As the couple were travelling back to Chiledu's homelands, they were ambushed. Mongols (Note: At this point in time, the word "Mongols" only referred to the members of one tribe in northeast Mongolia; because this tribe played a central role in the formation of the Mongol Empire, their name was later used for all the tribes.) out hawking had noticed Hö'elün's beauty and good health—the 17th-century Altan Tobchi chronicle claimed that they had ascertained her fertility from the colour of the ground she had urinated on—and their leader, an aristocratic ba'atur of the Borjigin clan named Yesügei, decided to take Hö'elün as his own wife. As her husband was outnumbered and faced certain death if he stayed with her, Hö'elün urged him to flee, giving him her blouse so he could remember her scent.

The practice of bride kidnapping was not uncommon on the steppe, but according to Anne Broadbridge, it caused "long-term social weaknesses" among the tribes, as can be seen from later events in Hö'elün's life. Though Chiledu never attempted to retrieve the bride he had spent time and money negotiating for, possibly because of Yesügei's renown as a leader, the Merkit did not forget their grudge, which later spiralled into a blood feud. Hö'elün was also isolated from her Olkhonud family, whom Yesügei probably never even met; she would be unable to ask them to help her and Yesügei's children in later, harder years. Hö'elün's kidnapping was omitted from most official chronicles and only appears in the Secret History. Yesügei had previously married another woman, usually named Sochigel by historians, who had already given birth to a son named Behter. Nevertheless, Hö'elün became Yesügei's primary wife, for reasons that are not entirely clear. Broadbridge speculates that her upbringing, which had previously made her eligible to be the valued wife of a chief's brother, placed her higher in Yesügei's eyes than a woman of lower status.

Hö'elün gave birth to her and Yesügei's first son at a place the Secret History records as Delüün Boldog on the Onon River; this has been variously identified at either Dadal in Khentii Province or in southern Agin-Buryat Okrug, in modern-day Russia. The year is similarly controversial, as different historians favour different dates: 1155, 1162 or 1167. The boy was named Temüjin, a word of uncertain meaning. Of the many legends surrounding Temüjin's birth, the most prominent tells that he clutched a blood clot as he was born, an Asian folklorish motif which indicated the child would be a warrior. Others claimed that Hö'elün was impregnated by a ray of light which announced the child's destiny, a legend which echoed that of the mythical ancestor Alan Gua. Yesügei and Hö'elün had three more sons, Qasar, Hachiun, and Temüge, and one daughter, Temülen. The siblings grew up at Yesügei's main camp on the banks of the Onon, where they learned how to ride a horse and shoot a bow; their companions included Behter and his younger full-brother Belgutei, the seven sons of Yesügei's trusted retainer Münglig, and other children of the tribe.

When Temüjin was eight years old, Yesügei decided to betroth him to a suitable girl; he took his heir to the pastures of Hö'elün's prestigious Onggirat tribe, and arranged a betrothal between Temüjin and Börte, the daughter of an Onggirat chieftain named Dei Sechen. While riding homewards alone, Yesügei requested a meal from a band of Tatars he encountered, relying on the steppe tradition of hospitality to strangers. However, the Tatars recognised Yesügei, who had fought against them in the past, and slipped poison into his food. Yesügei gradually sickened but managed to return home; close to death, he requested Münglig to retrieve Temüjin from the Onggirat. He died soon after.

=== Matriarch and advisor ===
Yesügei's death shattered the unity of his people, which included members of the Borjigin, Tayichiud, and other clans. As Temüjin was only around ten, and Behter around two years older, neither was considered old enough to rule. The Tayichiud faction excluded Hö'elün from the ancestor worship ceremonies which followed a ruler's death and soon abandoned her camp. The Secret History relates that the entire Borjigin clan followed, despite Hö'elün's attempts to shame them into staying by appealing to their honour. On the other hand, other sources such as Rashid al-Din imply that Yesügei's brothers stood by the widow. It is possible that Hö'elün may have refused to join in levirate marriage with one, or that the author of the Secret History dramatised the situation. All the sources agree that most of Yesügei's people renounced his family in favour of the Tayichiuds and that Hö'elün's family were reduced to a much harsher life. Taking up a traditional hunter-gatherer lifestyle, they collected roots and nuts, hunted for small animals, and caught fish. Hö'elün's courage and adaptable character were critical in the survival of her family.

Tensions developed as the children grew older. Both Temüjin and Behter had claims to be their father's heir: although Temüjin was the child of Yesügei's chief wife, Behter was at least two years older. There was even the possibility that, as permitted under levirate law, Behter could marry Hö'elün upon attaining his majority and become Temüjin's stepfather. With the friction exacerbated by regular disputes over the division of hunting spoils, Temüjin and his younger brother Qasar ambushed and killed Behter. This taboo act was omitted from the official chronicles but not from the Secret History, which recounts that Hö'elün angrily reprimanded her sons for their short-sighted course of action, which she thought a foolish imitation of their ancestors' heroic deeds.

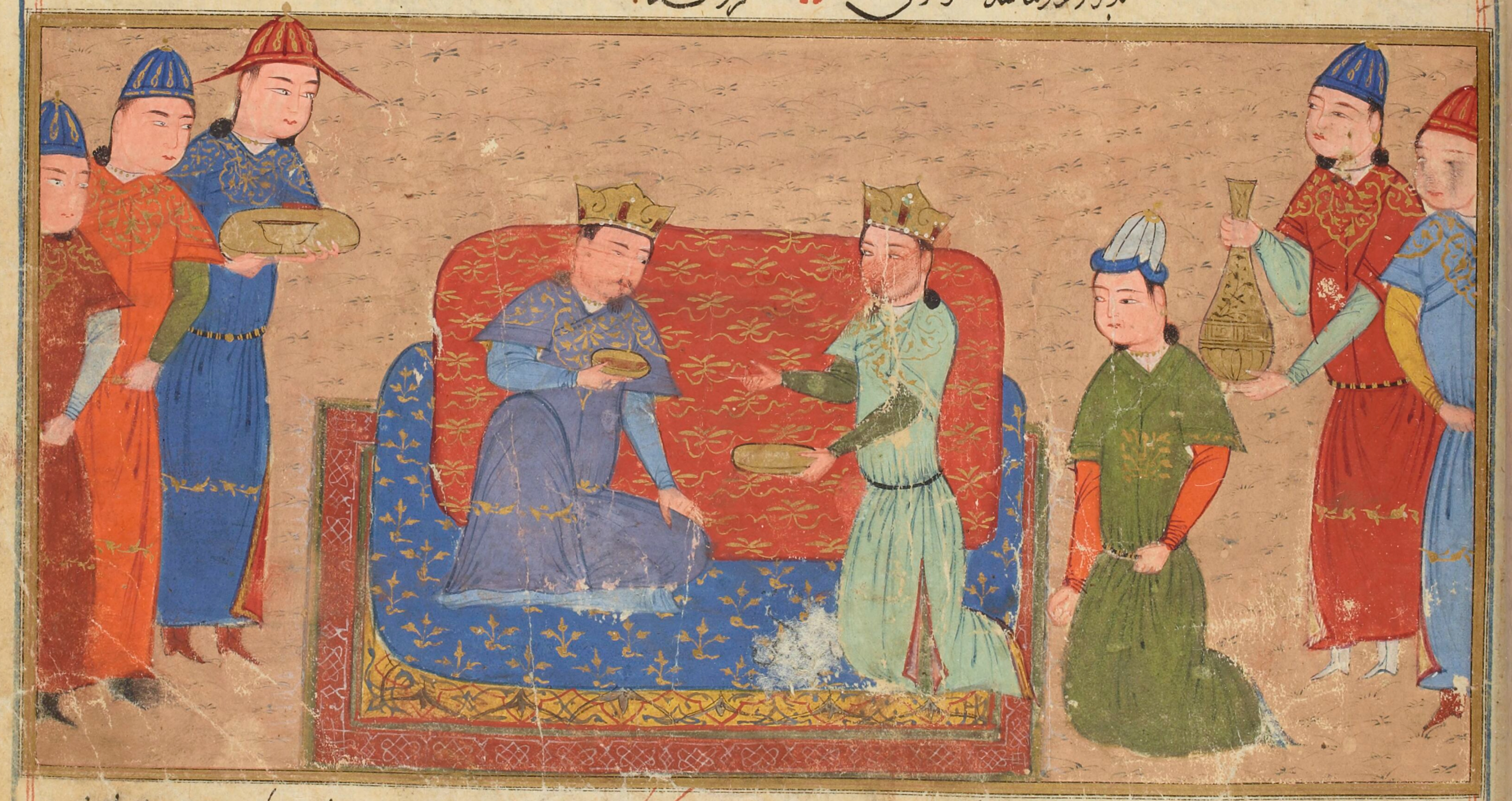
Temüjin meeting with Toghrul (Jami' al-tawarikh, 15th century)

When Temüjin married Börte at around the age of fifteen, her parents gave Hö'elün a black sable coat, which she let Temüjin give to Toghrul, khan of the Keraites, to secure an alliance. Hö'elün would have conceded some responsibilities in the division of labour to her new daughter-in-law—together, they managed the economy and resources of Temüjin's camp, allowing him a foundation from which he could pursue his military campaigns. She was present when Börte and Sochigel were abducted by the Merkits in revenge for Hö'elün's own abduction many years earlier; Börte was retrieved within a year. Hö'elün's advice was highly valued by Temüjin—he turned first to her and Börte for counsel when he split from Jamuqa, his friend-turned-rival. According to the Secret History, she also raised numerous foundlings as half-siblings for her children, but chronological problems indicate that the most famous, Shigi Qutuqu, was in fact raised by Börte.

After Jamuqa defeated Temüjin at Dalan Balzhut in 1187, many of his followers were repulsed by his cruel treatment of Temüjin's followers. These included Münglig and his sons; their earlier abandonment of the family was ignored and they were welcomed to such an extent that Hö'elün married Münglig in her third and final marriage. During the following years, when the locations and activities of Temüjin's family are near-completely unknown, it is likely that Hö'elün arranged marriages for her youngest son Temüge and daughter Temülen as their father would normally do; she was also instrumental in maintaining alliances while Temüjin had fled to the protection of the Jin dynasty in China. She may have accompanied him when he returned to the steppe in 1196.

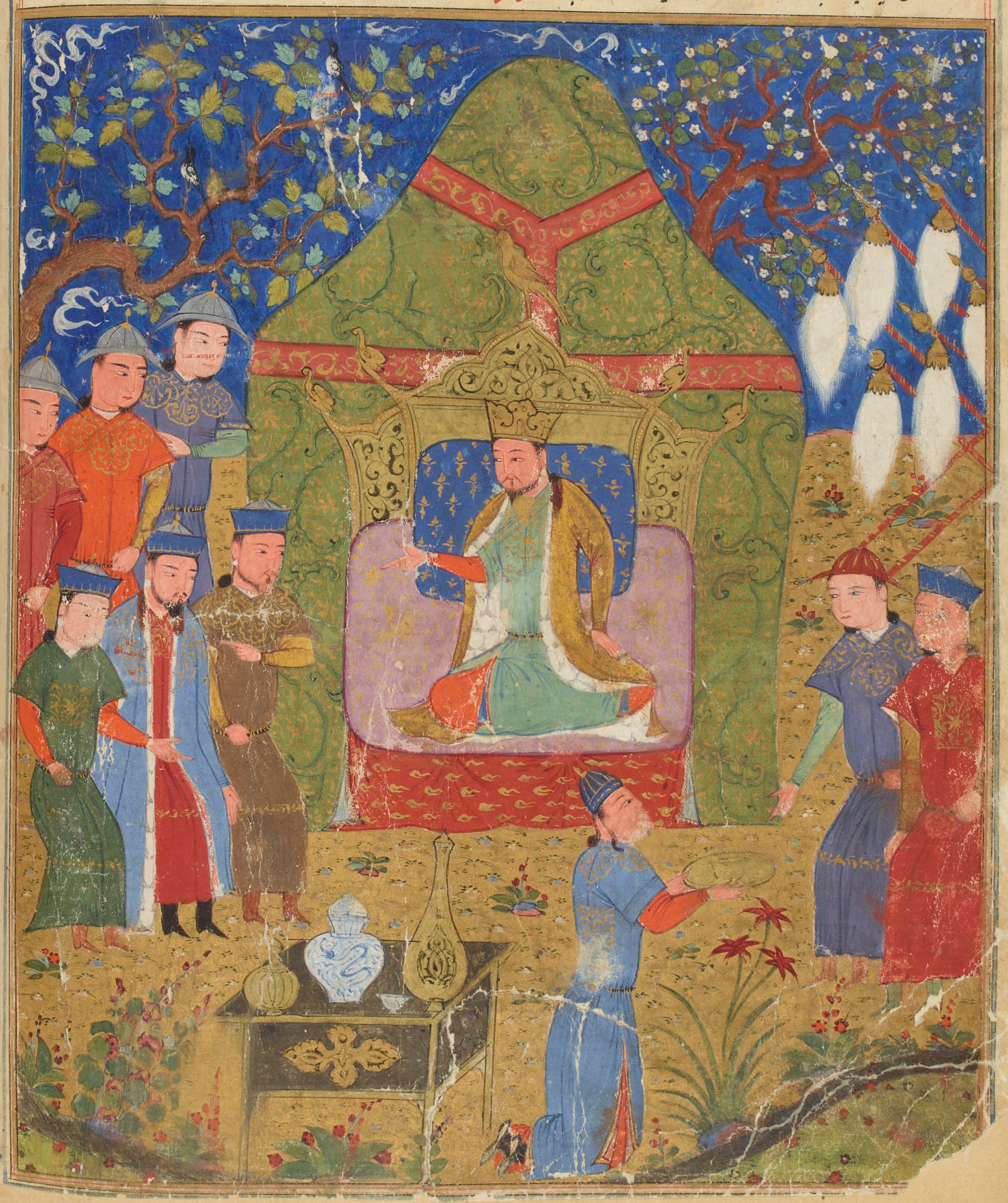
The kurultai of 1206 (Jami' al-tawarikh, 15th century)

Temüjin's 1206 coronation and entitlement as Genghis Khan preceded turmoil in Hö'elün's personal life. At a kurultai (large assembly), the newly-crowned Genghis handed out rewards to those who had aided him during his rise to power—twenty-one paragraphs of the Secret History are devoted to recording the details of the bestowals. Hö'elün was reportedly granted 10,000 followers, but as they were granted to her and her youngest son Temüge jointly, she felt the rewards undervalued her work and achievements. By contrast, Münglig was granted the privilege of sitting at the khan's right hand, making him the second-most powerful man on the steppe; in light of these events, their marriage may have come under strain.

One of Münglig's sons, the shaman Kokechu, also mounted a challenge for Genghis' throne. Kokechu managed to divide Genghis from his brothers Qasar and Temüge, whom Hö'elün vigorously defended; later, she and Börte convinced Genghis that Kokechu had to be eliminated, which Temüge accomplished in a staged wrestling match. The Secret History claims that Hö'elün, worn out by her efforts, died soon after. Although some historians, such as Igor de Rachewiltz, have termed this poetical melodrama, nothing more is known of her life. Hö'elün had received the posthumous name Empress Xuanyi (宣懿皇后) by the time of the Yuan dynasty.

== See also ==
- Women in the Mongol Empire
