= Dost Muhammad (Moghul Khan) =

- Khan

Khan of Eastern Moghulistan (Uyghurstan)
- Reign: 1462–1468
- Predecessor: Esen Buqa II
- Successor: Kebek Sultan
- Born: c. 1445
- Died: 1468
- Father: Esen Buqa II

Dost Muhammad Khan (Chagatai and Persian: دوست محمد خان; Chinese: 笃思忒马黑麻; pinyin: Dǔsītè Mǎhēimá; c. 1445 – 1468/9) was Khan of Aqsu in Moghulistan from 1462 until his death. He was the son of Esen Buqa II.

When Esen Buqa died in 1462, the Dughlat amirs were divided over whether they should follow his son Dost Muhammad, who was then seventeen or his brother Yunus Khan. Muhammad Haidar Mirza, who controlled Kashgar, was cousin to Yunus Khan (his mother was Uzun Sultan Khanim, sister of Vais Khan and aunt of Yunus Khan), but chose the former, because supported before his father and was married to Esen Buqa daughter, Daulat Nigar Khanim. Opposely Saniz Mirza, who controlled Yarkand, sided with Yunus Khan and expelled Muhammad Haidar from Kashgar, who joined Dost Muhammad in Aqsu. Two years later, in 1464, Saniz Mirza died of wounds which he got while out hunting and Dost Muhammad led an expedition against Yarkand; he retired after the amirs of the town gave him Saniz Mirza's widow, Jamal Agha by name, his eldest son, Mirza Abu Bakr, his son Omar Mirza and daughter Khan Sultan Khanim, all of whom he later took back with him to Aqsu. He then went against Kashgar, but Muhammad Haidar had already returned to the town. Dost Muhammad sent Muhammad Haidar away and then plundered Kashgar, which enraged the Dughlat amir and caused him to defect to Yunus Khan.

Dost Muhammad's principal city was Aqsu. He gave his sister Husn Nigar Khanim in marriage to the young Mirza Abu Bakr, but nevertheless the latter fled to his uncle Muhammad Haidar Mirza and Dost Muhammad Khan sent Husn Nigar Khanim after him to Kashgar. Dost Muhammad was a very brave and generous man and of so great height, that if he stood on foot in the midst of a hundred people, any one seeing him would have said he was on horseback. But he had unsound mind and died of sickness in 1468 or 1469. In the confusion following his death, Yunus Khan seized Aqsu, while his son, Kebek Sultan, was carried off to rule in Turfan.

| Preceded by Esen Buqa II | eastern Moghul Khan; 1462–1468/9 | Succeeded by Kebek Sultan |
