= Tolui =

Regent of the Mongol Empire from 1227 to 1229

Tolui; ᠲᠤᠯᠤᠢ
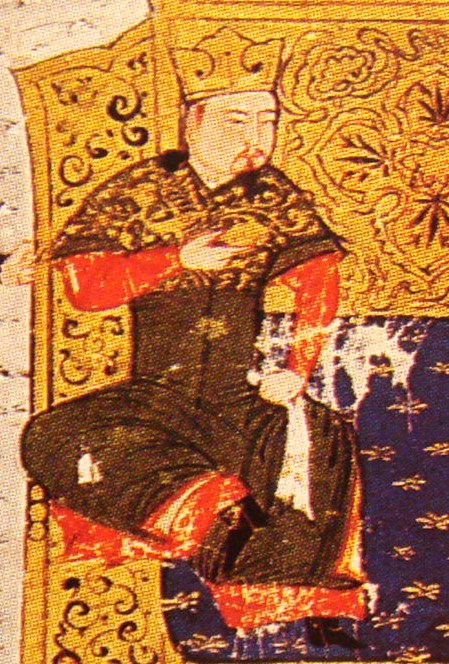
- Depiction of Tolui from a 14th-century manuscript of Rashid al-Din's Jami' al-tawarikh
- Born: c. 1191
- Died: 1232
- Spouse: Sorghaghtani Beki; Doquz Khatun
- Issue: Möngke Khan; Kublai Khan; Hulagu Khan; Ariq Böke; Qutuqtu
Names
- Tolui (拖雷 or 圖壘)
Posthumous name
- Emperor Yingwu (英武皇帝) (conferred in 1251); Emperor Jingxiang (景襄皇帝) (conferred in 1265)
Temple name
- Ruizong (睿宗)
- House: Borjigin
- Father: Genghis Khan
- Mother: Börte Ujin

Tolui (c. 1191 – 1232) was the youngest son of Genghis Khan and Börte. A prominent general during the early Mongol conquests, Tolui was a leading candidate to succeed his father after his death in 1227 and ultimately served as regent of the Mongol Empire until the accession of his brother Ögedei two years later. Tolui's wife was Sorghaghtani Beki; their sons included Möngke and Kublai, the fourth and fifth khans of the empire, and Hulagu, the founder of the Ilkhanate.

Tolui was less active than his elder brothers Jochi, Chagatai, and Ögedei during their father's rise to power, but once he reached adulthood he was considered the finest warrior of the four. He commanded armies under his father during the first invasion of Jin China (1211–1215), and his distinguished service during the Mongol invasion of the Khwarazmian Empire secured his reputation. After the fall of the cities of Transoxiana in 1220, Genghis dispatched Tolui early the following year to subjugate the region of Khorasan, which had begun to cause trouble for the Mongol armies. Tolui executed his orders with ruthless efficiency, assaulting the major cities of Merv, Nishapur, and Herat, and subjugating numerous others. Medieval chroniclers attributed more than three million deaths to the massacres he ordered at Nishapur and Merv; while these figures are considered exaggerated by modern historians, they are evidence of the abnormal brutality of Tolui's campaign.

As the Mongols' traditional inheritance system was a form of ultimogeniture, Tolui was always a leading candidate to succeed his father. His position was strengthened by the elimination of Jochi and Chagatai, on account of possible illegitimacy and excessive arrogance respectively. Genghis eventually passed Tolui over in favour of Ögedei, who was known for his generosity. Tolui was on his father's last campaign when the latter died in mid-1227; as the youngest son, he became regent, in charge of his father's burial and the administration of the nation. It is possible that the two-year interregnum was lengthened by Tolui's desire to become khan himself; he nevertheless eventually swore allegiance to Ögedei, who was crowned in 1229.

Tolui accompanied Ögedei after the resumption of warfare against the Jin dynasty in 1230. The campaign was successful and they returned home to Mongolia two years later. Tolui died in unclear circumstances in late 1232. The official record was that he died during a shamanic ritual while saving Ögedei from a curse; alternative theories suggest that he died from alcoholism or that Ögedei had him poisoned. Having taken over Tolui's lands and estates after his death, Sorghaghtani amassed enough wealth and supporters to ensure that her son Möngke took power in 1251, after the death of Ögedei's son Güyük.

== Life ==
=== Life under Genghis (c. 1191 – 1227) ===
The year of Tolui's birth is disputed; while the historian Christopher Atwood believes he was born in 1191 or 1192, the sinologists Frederick W. Mote and Paul Ratchnevsky placed the date in the late 1180s. He was the fourth son of Temüjin, the future Genghis Khan, and Börte, Temüjin's first wife; his elder brothers were Jochi (b. c. 1184), Chagatai (b. c. 1185), and Ögedei (b. c. 1186). He also had five full sisters—in order of birth, these were Qojin, Chechiyegen, Alaqa, Tumelun, and Altun. The name "Tolui" (Mongolian script: ᠲᠤᠯᠤᠢ, Mongolian: Толуй, meaning 'mirror') has also been transliterated to English as Toli and Tuluy, among other spellings. The historian Isenbike Togan has speculated that "Tolui" was a title which Genghis intended to replace the pre-imperial epithet otchigin, traditionally given to the youngest son.

Shortly after Temüjin's campaign against the Tatars c. 1196, Tolui, then a young child, was the subject of a kidnapping attempt recounted in two sources: the 13th-century Mongolian poem The Secret History of the Mongols and the Jami' al-tawarikh history by the 14th-century Persian historian Rashid al-Din. According to the Secret History, the five year-old Tolui was saved by Altani, the wife of the general Boroqul, who held onto the Tatar kidnapper until two other Mongols killed him; Rashid al-Din on the other hand recounts that Tolui was saved by his adopted brother Shigi Qutuqu, then a young adolescent, with the help of a nearby Mongol sheepdog. After the defeat and death of the Kereit khan Toghrul in 1203, Tolui received Toghrul's niece Sorghaghtani Beki and granddaughter Doquz Khatun, both Nestorian Christians, as wives. Tolui and Sorghaghtani had their first son, Möngke, in 1209; Kublai and Hulagu followed in 1215 and 1217 respectively, while their final son Ariq Böke was born more than a decade afterwards. Tolui also married Lingqun, the daughter of Kuchlug, prince of the Naiman tribe, and had a son named Qutuqtu with her.

Tolui was considered the best warrior of the sons of Temüjin, who entitled himself Genghis Khan at a kurultai in 1206. He commanded armies during the invasion of Jin China; when Genghis was wounded by an arrow during the siege of Xijing (modern Datong), Tolui was appointed to command the besieging army until the Mongols withdrew. With his brother-in-law Chigu, he assaulted the walls of Dexing in autumn 1213 during preparations for the assault on the Juyong Pass.

==== Khorasan campaign (1221) ====
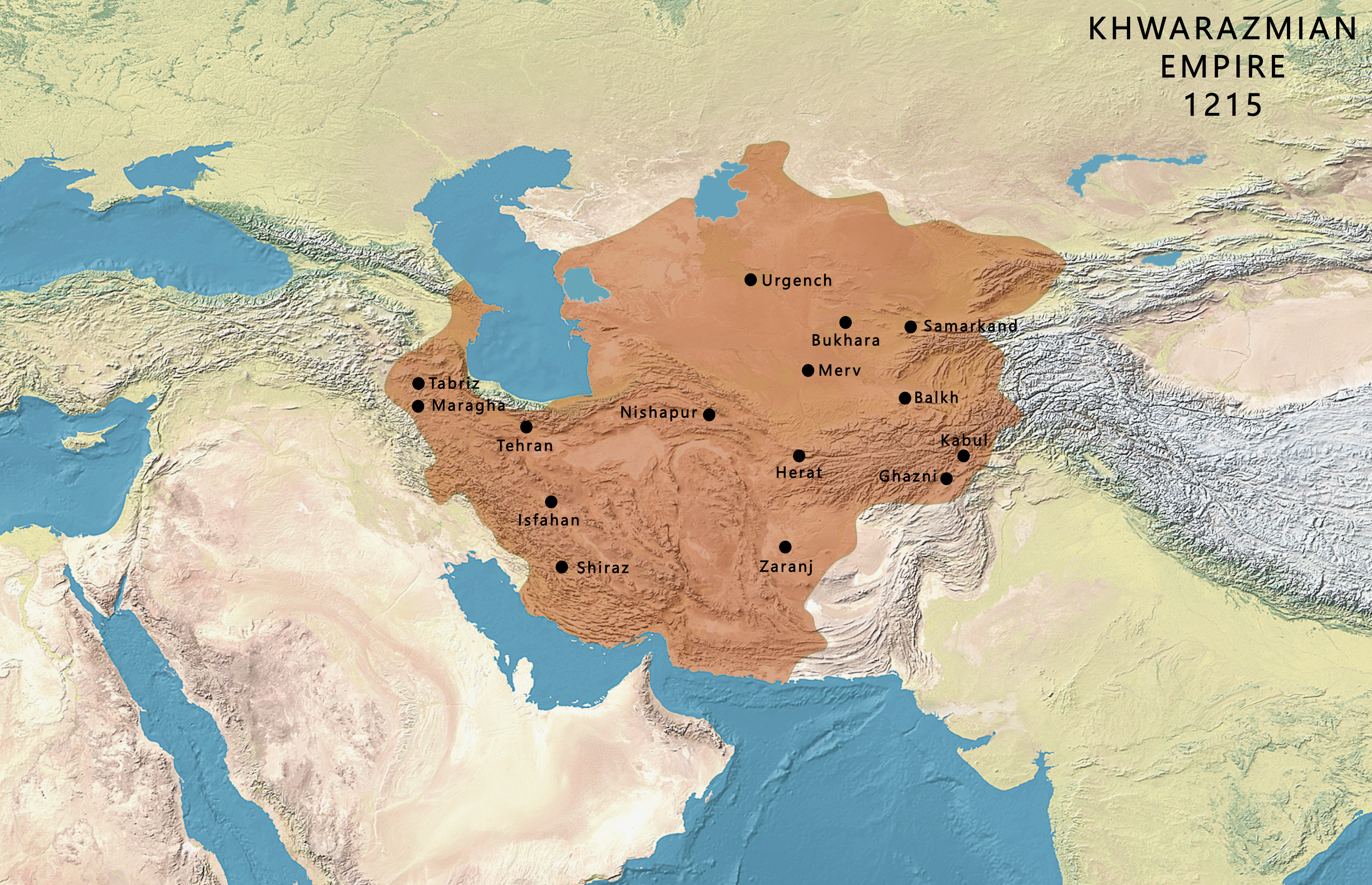
A map of the Khwarazmian Empire in 1215; Tolui's campaign subjugated Khorasan, the central region of the empire.

During the invasion of the Khwarazmian Empire, which began in 1219, Tolui initially accompanied his father's army. They bypassed the ongoing siege at Otrar to attack the major centres of Transoxiana—the Khwarazmshah's capital Samarkand and its neighbour Bukhara—in early 1220. The latter was captured in February after a swift siege, while Samarkand fell a couple of months later. Genghis moved southwards into the Turkestan mountain range, where he rested his army for the summer while his generals Jebe and Subutai moved westwards and his sons conducted various operations; he emerged in the autumn to assault and capture Termez. Tolui and his father spent the winter of 1220–1221 dealing with rebels on the upper Vakhsh river in modern-day Tajikistan. By this point, Jebe and Subutai had moved into western Iran, and the cities which had earlier submitted to them in the Khorasan region had become bolder; Genghis Khan's son-in law Toquchar was killed by a nascent rebellion at Nishapur in November 1220. After capturing Balkh in early 1221 and while continuing to besiege Taliqan, Genghis dispatched Tolui to Khorasan to make sure that no opposition remained in the extensive and wealthy region. His task was to pacify and subjugate the region and its cities by any means possible, and he carried out the task "with a thoroughness from which that region has never recovered", in the words of the historian J. A. Boyle.

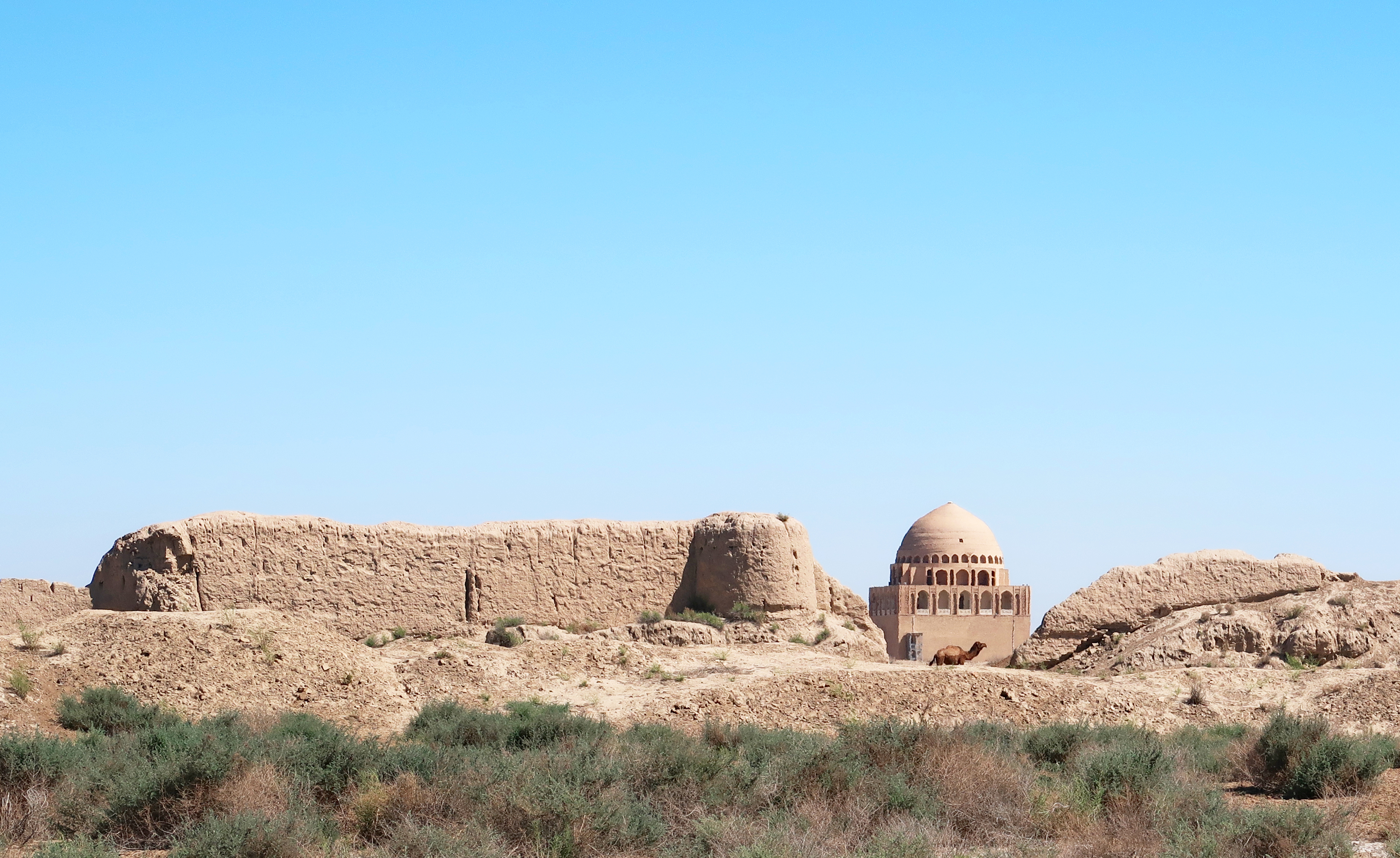
The walls of the city of Merv, which never recovered from the Mongol conquests; the tomb of Ahmad Sanjar can be seen through a gap in the ruined fortifications.

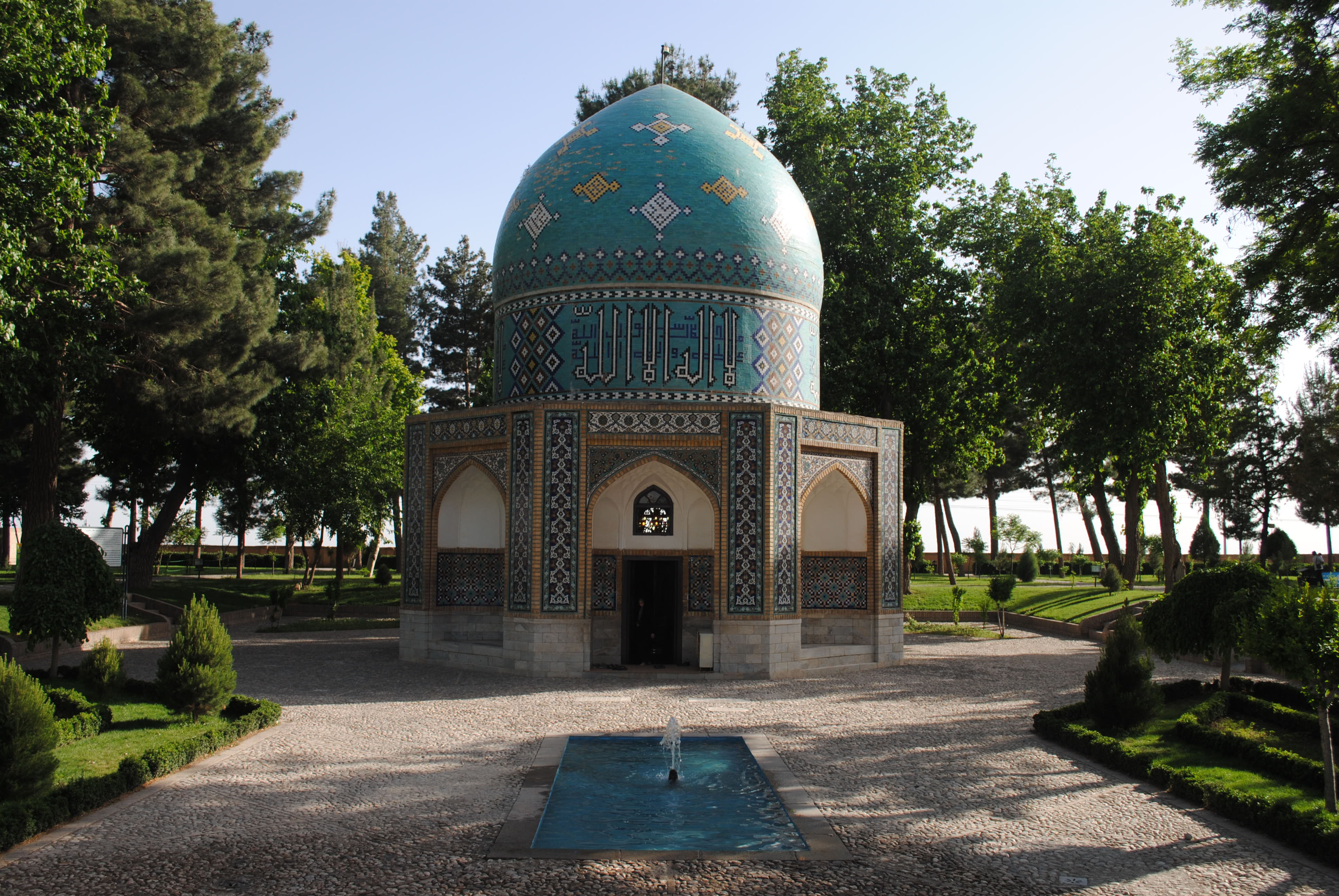
The mausoleum of Attar of Nishapur, a Persian poet who was killed during the sack of Nishapur, was built during the Timurid Renaissance in the 15th century.

Tolui's army was composed of a tenth of the Mongol invasion force augmented by Khwarazmian conscripts; the historian Carl Sverdrup estimates its size at around 7,000 men. He marched westwards from Balkh to Murichaq, on the present-day Afghanistan–Turkmenistan border, and then crossed the Marghab River and its tributary the Kushk to approach the city of Merv from the south. He ambushed a force of Turkmen raiders during the night of 24 February; the surprise attack caught the raiders off guard, and those who were not killed by the Mongols or did not drown in the river were scattered. The Mongols arrived at Merv the following day. After assessing the city for six days, Tolui came to the conclusion that the city fortifications would withstand a lengthy siege. Having been subjected to a general assault on the seventh day, the townspeople, who twice attempted a sortie to no effect, lost the will to resist and surrendered to the Mongols, who promised to treat them fairly. Tolui, however, reneged on this guarantee, and ordered that the entire population be driven out on the plain and put to the sword, excluding a small number of artisans and children. It was reported that each Mongol soldier was allotted between three and four hundred people to kill; the contemporary chronicler Ibn al-Athir estimated the number of deaths at 700,000, while the chronicler Ata-Malik Juvayni, writing a few decades later, recorded that a cleric spent thirteen days counting the dead and arrived at a figure of 1,300,000.

Tolui had meanwhile marched on south-westerly towards Nishapur, which had already seen a number of events during the war. Muhammad II, the ruler of the Khwarazmian Empire, had arrived nearly a year earlier on 18 April 1220, fleeing the Mongol advance in Transoxiana. He departed in mid-May that year, just in time to escape the armies of Jebe and Subutai, who arrived the following day. The city submitted to the generals, who requested them to reduce their walls and aid any Mongols who passed by. However, the city did not heed these instructions and instead began causing trouble for the Mongols, killing Toquchar when he attempted to enforce control. Jalal al-Din, the eldest son and heir of the now-deceased Muhammad II, arrived at the city on 10 February 1221, attempting to escape the ongoing Mongol siege at Gurganj, the capital of the empire; he remained at the city for only a couple of days before departing in the direction of Zozan.

Tolui arrived at the city on 7 April and the inhabitants, awed by the size of his force, immediately sought to agree surrender terms. Because the killing of the khan's son-in-law had been a grave insult to the Mongols, all proposals were rejected; the assault had begun before the end of the day, with the walls being breached on 9 April and the city captured the next day. According to Juvayni, the city was razed in revenge; Toquchar's widow supervised the massacre of the entire population of the city, with the exception of 400 craftsmen. Unlike in Merv, all children were killed, and the corpses of the alleged 1,747,000 victims, including all the cats and dogs in the city, were piled in great heaps. The ground was subsequently ploughed over. While marching through the region, Tolui was also sending detachments against surrounding towns such as Abiward, Nasa, Tus, and Jajarm.

There has been some confusion about the fate of Herat, the last of the great cities of Khorasan. The early 20th-century historian Vasily Bartold, citing a local history from the 1400s, stated that none of the inhabitants were killed with the exception of the garrison; meanwhile, the chronicler Minhaj-i Siraj Juzjani, who fought the Mongols nearby, recorded that after an eight-month siege, the city was taken and its population slaughtered. It is now known, thanks to a chronicle rediscovered in 1944, that there were two sieges of Herat. The first started with the execution of a Mongol diplomat in the town; an incensed Tolui launched an eight-day assault, which culminated in the death of the town's malik (governor). From the edge of the city moat, Tolui proclaimed that the inhabitants would be spared if they surrendered. Unlike at Merv, the Mongols honoured their word, only killing the 12,000 men in the city garrison. Having appointed a Mongol overseer to govern the town, Tolui left the region to rejoin his father at Taliqan in mid-1221. The population subsequently rebelled and were besieged for months by the Mongol general Eljigidei, who was said to have killed between 1,600,000 and 2,400,000 people during his sack of the town, in a massacre lasting seven days in June 1222.

The death tolls traditionally attributed to Tolui's campaign in Khorasan are considered exaggerated by modern historians. The cities of Merv, Nishapur, and Herat could have only supported fractions of their reported populations, and populations were reported to return almost miraculously to destroyed cities—Genghis Khan's adopted son Shigi Qutuqu was said to have ordered the deaths of a further 100,000 at Merv in November 1221, after yet another rebellion. The figures do however clearly represent a demographic catastrophe so extreme the native populations found it difficult to quantify the destruction. The historian Michal Biran has suggested that the speed with which the Mongols brought the pragmatically brutal warfare of East Asia into the less ruthless Muslim world was a factor in this cultural shock.

=== Regency and succession question (1227–1229) ===
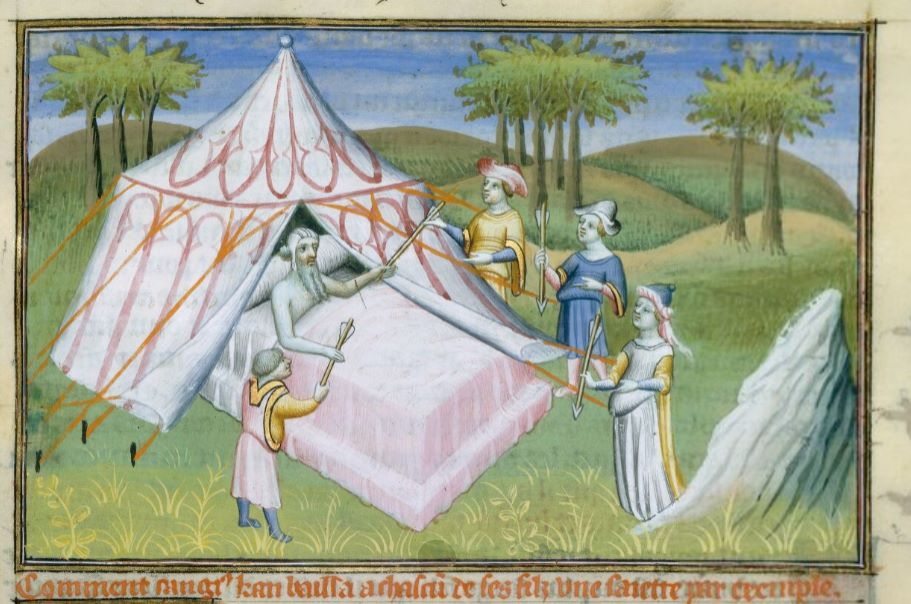
Early 15th-century miniature of Genghis Khan advising his sons on his deathbed, taken from Marco Polo's section of the Livre des merveilles manuscript.

The tribes of the Mongol steppe had no fixed succession system, but often defaulted to some form of ultimogeniture—succession of the youngest son—on the grounds that unlike his older brothers, the youngest son would not have had time to gain a following for himself and needed the help of his father's inheritance; but this applied only to property, not to titles. Through the Mongol appanage system, Genghis allocated lands and populations as property to each member of his close family. His brothers Qasar, Hachiun, Temüge, and Belgutei were given lands along the Greater Khingan mountains in the east, and the lands of his three elder sons were located in the west: for Jochi, along the Irtysh river, extending into Siberia and the territory of the Kipchaks; for Chagatai, the former Qara Khitai territories surrounding Almaligh in Turkestan; for Ögedei, lands in Dzungaria; (Note: Ögedei's allocation was relatively small in area because he would receive a large amount of personal land when he became khan.) and for Tolui the Mongolian fatherland near the Altai Mountains.

The Secret History of the Mongols records that he chose his successor at the behest of his wife Yisui while preparing for the Khwarazmian campaigns in 1219. Rashid al-Din, on the other hand, states that the decision came before the khan's final campaign against the Xia dynasty. Regardless of the date, there were five possible candidates: Genghis Khan's four sons and his youngest brother Temüge, who had the weakest claim and who was never seriously considered. Even though there was a strong possibility Jochi, born after Börte had been kidnapped and raped by Merkit tribesmen, was illegitimate, Genghis was not particularly concerned by this; nevertheless, he and Jochi became increasingly estranged over time. This was due to Jochi's preference for remaining in and growing his own appanage—his actions during the Siege of Gurganj, where his reluctance to destroy a wealthy city that would become part of his territory eventually led to his failure to give Genghis the khan's share of the booty, exacerbated the tensions. Genghis was angered by Jochi's refusal to attend a kurultai in 1223, allegedly because he was busy hunting, and was considering sending Ögedei and Chagatai to bring him back to heel when news came that Jochi had died from a serious illness.

Chagatai's attitude towards Jochi's possible succession—he had termed his elder brother "a Merkit bastard" and had brawled with him in front of their father—led Genghis to view him as uncompromising, arrogant, and narrow-minded, despite his great knowledge of Mongol legal customs. His elimination left Ögedei and Tolui as the two primary candidates. Tolui was unquestionably superior in military terms. His campaign in Khorasan had broken the Khwarazmian Empire, while Ögedei was far less able as a commander and was known to drink excessively even by Mongol standards. He was however well-liked by all in the nation and was known for his generosity, courtesy, and willingness to mediate and compromise. Aware of his own lack of military skill, he placed his trust in his capable subordinates. He was also more likely to preserve Mongol traditions than Tolui, whose wife Sorghaghtani, herself a Nestorian Christian, was a patron of many other religions.

Tolui was accompanying his father Genghis Khan when the latter died in 1227 during the campaign against the Xia. As the youngest son, Tolui served as regent and administered the empire; possibly drawing upon previous traditions, he established a precedent for what to do after a khan's death. These included the halting of all offensive military actions involving Mongol troops, the establishment of a lengthy mourning period, which the regent would oversee, and the holding of a kurultai which would nominate successors and select them. For Tolui, this presented an opportunity. He was still a viable candidate for succession and had the support of the family of Jochi. Any general kurultai, attended by the commanders Genghis had promoted and honoured, would however observe their former ruler's desires without question and appoint Ögedei as ruler. The historian Timothy May has suggested that Tolui's reluctance to hold the kurultai was driven by the knowledge of the threat it posed to his ambitions. In the end, Tolui had to be convinced by the bureaucrat Yelu Chucai to hold the kurultai; in 1229, it crowned Ögedei as khan, with Tolui recorded as the first to acclaim the new ruler; the Secret History, written by Toluid-favouring chroniclers, possibly exaggerates his role.

=== Life under Ögedei and death (1229–1232) ===
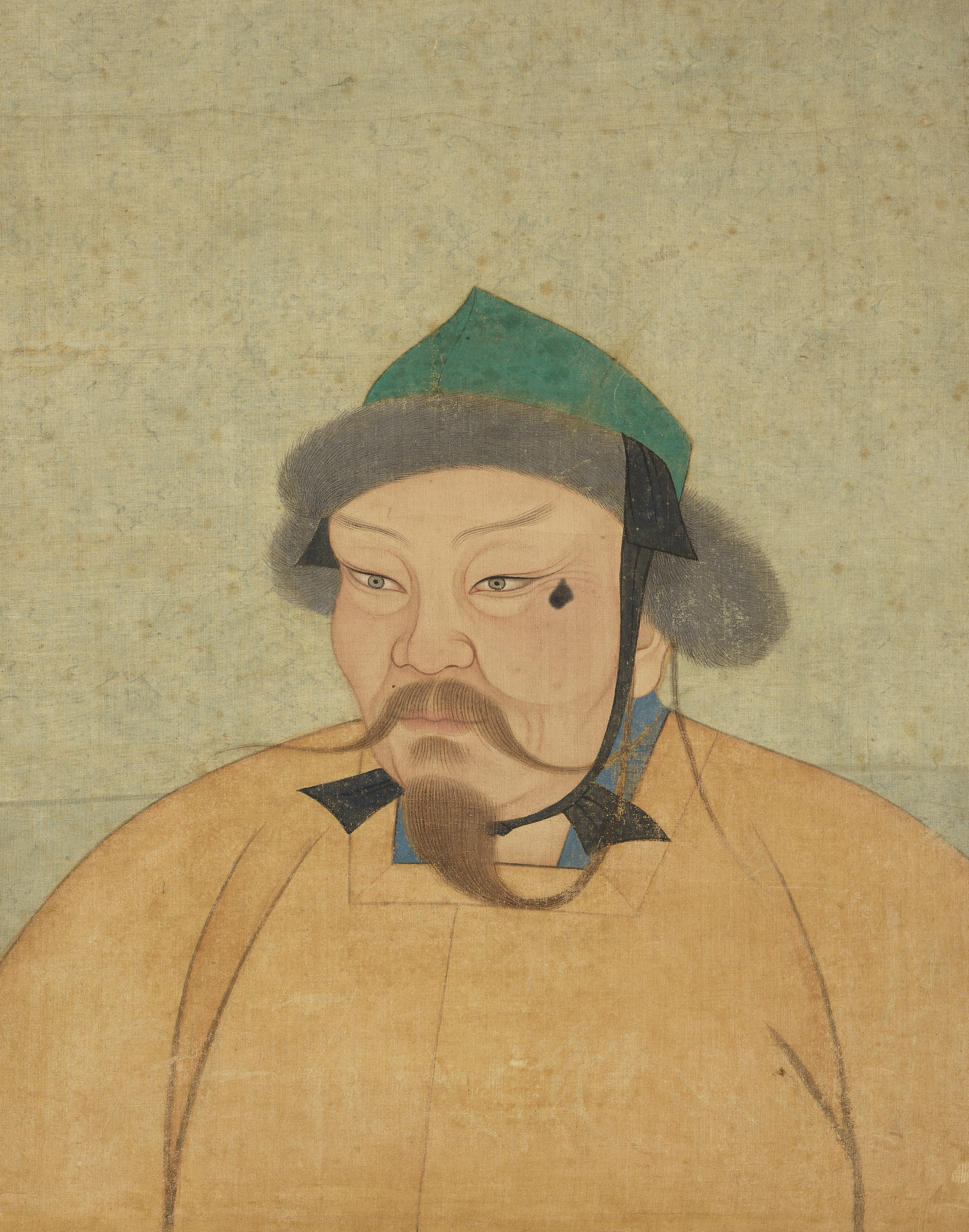
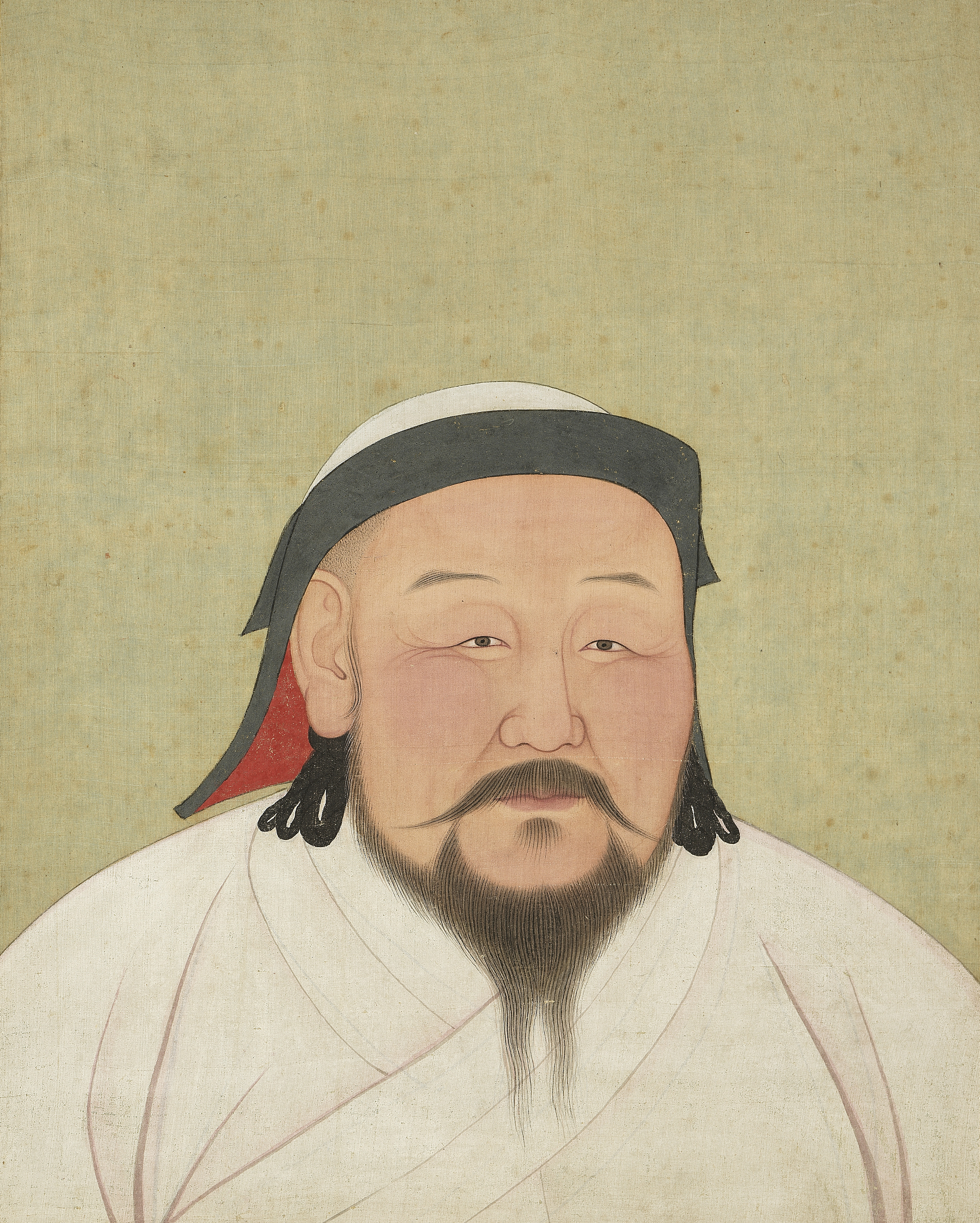
Tolui's elder brother Ögedei (top) and third son Kublai (bottom), as depicted in late 13th-century paintings (National Palace Museum, Taipei)

The remnants of the Jin dynasty in Shaanxi were proving difficult to handle at the start of Ögedei's reign: their leading general defeated a Mongol general in 1230 at the Tongguan Pass. Ögedei took to the field himself in autumn, accompanied by Tolui and the latter's son Möngke, who had been raised by Ögedei's third wife Angqui. Much of the events of this campaign are confused in the sources due to chronological difficulties and later suppressions of taboo information: the following is a rough outline by the historian Christopher Atwood. The defeat at the Tongguan Pass was likely followed by two more, including one over Subutai; these reverses threatened the stability of Ögedei's reign and so he set out personally, accompanied by his close family. A number of sources written during the reign of Tolui's son Kublai attribute the defeats to Ögedei's poor generalship and credit Tolui both for the subsequent victories and for rebuking his brother's petulant complaints with words of wisdom.

With the Tongguan Pass securely held by the Jin and the Mongol army suffering from famine in the depleted Shaanxi province, the brothers withdrew to Inner Mongolia to plan. They decided to adopt one of their father's ideas: in a massive pincer movement, Tolui, accompanied by Subutai and Shigi Qutuqu, would bypass Tongguan by traversing Song territory to the south of Shaanxi, while Ogedei marched towards the Jin capital Kaifeng along the Yellow River. This risky strategy paid off—although Tolui's men allegedly suffered such deprivations they resorted to cannibalism—he successfully managed to gather provisions from untouched Song lands, cross back into the Jin province of Henan, and engage the enemy at Mount Sangfeng on 9 February 1232. Outnumbering Tolui's army by a large margin, the Jin threatened to rape all the Mongol women in the army; after Tolui's forces emerged victorious, they retaliated with the sodomization of the entire Jin force. Tolui's success strengthened his position in the Mongol court, while Ogedei's mediocre military performance weakened his own.

Tolui died later that year in mysterious circumstances near Beijing; he had travelled northwards with his brother while Subutai besieged Kaifeng. According to the official records in the Secret History, he sacrificed his life in a shamanic ritual to spare Ögedei, who had been cursed by the maleficent spirits of Jin China; although the shamans sought to bribe the spirits with gifts of booty, livestock, or commoners, they were only willing to accept a member of the imperial family. It is recorded that Tolui volunteered for this fate, following a prophecy he had allegedly made during his father's lifetime, a peculiar account that has given rise to suspicions that Ögedei had Tolui murdered. Atwood has theorised that these suspicions were the intended aim of the author of Secret History, writing under the patronage of Tolui's descendants wanting to subtly discredit their Ögedeid rivals. He proposes that the prosaic explanation of a death from alcoholism, as recorded by Juvayni, was the most likely; the official line was nevertheless propagated by Sorghaghtani to cement her family's position at the top of the Mongol court.

Sorghaghtani inherited Tolui's property after his death on Ögedei's command; with the backing of his vast estates in Mongolia, she became one of the most respected and powerful figures in the empire. She played a major role in cultivating an alliance with the descendants of Jochi in the Golden Horde, which culminated in the Toluid Revolution of 1252, the accession of her eldest son Möngke, and a near-total purge of the Ögedeid and Chagataid branches of the imperial family; The Toluids would remain the holders of the imperial title as it evolved into the Yuan dynasty under the second son Kublai and eventually fell, while their third son Hulagu became the founder of the Ilkhanate in Persia. Tolui was later elevated to the status of khan by Kublai, after he established the Yuan dynasty in the late 13th-century, while he and Sorghaghtani also became major figures of the Eight White Yurts cult in Mongolia, today headquartered at the Mausoleum of Genghis Khan.

== Family ==
Khans or regents of the Mongol Empire are in bold. Source:

Hoelun	Yesugei
Börte	Genghis Khan	Hasar	Hachiun	Temüge
Jochi	Chagatai	Ögedei	Tolui	Sorghaghtani Beki
Güyük	Möngke	Kublai	Hulagu	Ariq Böke
Zhenjin
Temür

Tolui House of Borjigin (1206–1635) Born: 1191 Died: 1232
Regnal titles
Preceded by Genghis Khan	Regent of the Mongol Empire; 1227–1229	Succeeded by Ögedei Khan
