= Temüge =

Brother of Genghis Khan (1168–1246)

Temüge (Mongolian: Тэмүгэ) (c. 1168–1246) was the youngest brother of Genghis Khan, fourth son of Yesugei.

== Early life ==
The Secret History of the Mongols states that "when Temujin was 9 years of age, Temüge was three years old." As the youngest son, he received a prefix to the name "otchigin" (diminutive form of "отгон" or “otgon” meaning "junior", Also Ot (Fire) Tegin (Junior member of Khan family) as old Turkic), who in the family is always a "guardian of the family and home", and therefore is often referred to as Temüge-otchigin or simply Otchigin. In childhood and adolescence was somewhat spoiled by his mother and older brothers, inclined to luxury, but was "courageous, powerful and quick in battle" that was recognized even by the family's enemies. When the Böö, Kokochu (Teb-Tengri) started dragging the power over the Mongols to his own family, Genghis Khan sanctioned Temüge to kill Kokochu in an orchestrated wrestling match.

== Interim ruler ==
As the youngest male offspring, Temüge and his mother, by Mongol traditions, were allotted the most land and people by Genghis Khan during his coronation. He seems to have been the least warlike of the brothers, and was criticized by Genghis himself as lazy and shiftless. However, Temüge was a skilled politician and capable ruler, who, alongside his mother Hoelun, ruled the Mongol heartland in his elder brothers' absence while they engaged in military campaigns. He appears to have had intellectual leanings, first coming under the influence of the conquered Xia and Jin cultures and then taking an active interest in the other cultures encompassed in the Mongol Empire.

Temüge attempted to enter the main political arena after the death of Ögedei Khan, his nephew and son of Genghis Khan, in 1241. At that time, Ogedei's son Güyük Khan was engaged in the "Western campaign" in Russia and Europe. Temüge-otchigin tried to seize the throne, but was prevented by Töregene, Ogedei's widow and Güyük's mother. After the 1246 kurultai elected Güyük as great khan, Temüge was executed.

== Ancestry ==
Yesugei Baghatur	Hoelun
Belgutei	Behter	Qasar	Hachiun	Temüge	Temüjin (Genghis Khan)	Börte
Jochi	Chagatai	Ögedei	Tolui
