= Esen Buqa II =

Mongolian ruler in Central Asia

Khan of Moghulistan
- Reign: 1429–1462
- Predecessor: Satuq Khan
- Successor: Yunus Khan, Dost Muhammad
- Born: unknown
- Died: 1462

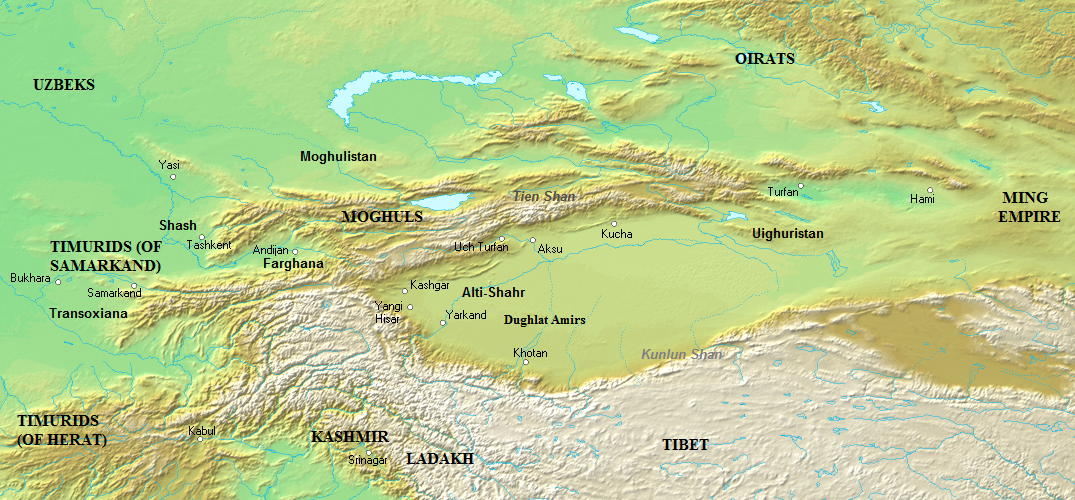
Central Asia at the beginning of 1450 AD. The Moghuls controlled Moghulistan, Altishahr, and Uyghurstan.

Esen Buqa II (Chagatai: اسن بوقا ثانی; died 1462) was Khan of Moghulistan from 1429 until his death. He was the younger son of Uwais Khan.

When Uwais Khan was killed in 1428 the Moghuls were thrown into a state of confusion. Some of them supported Esen Buqa, while others supported his older brother, Yunus Khan. The party of Yunus Khan, however, found themselves a minority and fled to the Timurid Ulugh Beg.

With Yunus Khan's departure, Esen Buqa was the uncontested khan. The first few years of his reign went by smoothly; all of the Moghuls were loyal to him, while the town of Kashgar, which had been captured by the Timurids after Uwais Khan had died, was retaken in 1435. However, the Amirs thought little of Esen Buqa, who had ascended the throne while still a child. They began to resent his authority and the country fell into a state of disorder. The khan moved to Aksu and after some time managed to regain the loyalty of the amirs. As result he gave his daughter Daulat Nigar Khanim in marriage to Muhammad Haidar Mirza, son of Dughlat Amir of Kashgar Sayyid Ali.

Soon after he had regained control of Moghulistan, Esen Buqa began to conduct raids into the territory of Timurids of Transoxiana. In 1451 he attacked Tashkent, and a second expedition was undertaken soon afterwards. He also besieged and temporarily gained control over Andijan. The Timurid Abu Sa'id had the military strength to defeat the Moghuls in Transoxiana, but could not pursue them in Moghulistan.

Frustrated at the continuing Moghul raids, Abu Sa'id sent for Yunus Khan, then in Iraq. He equipped Yunus Khan with an army and sent him to take over Moghulistan. He gained the support of several amirs and approached Kashgar. Esen Buqa caught him a few miles from the town and in the ensuing battle proved victorious, forcing his brother to flee back to Abu Sa'id. A short time later Esen Buqa again had to deal with Yunus Khan, who once again gained the support of the amirs when he entered Moghulistan, but was unable to make any real headway against his brother.

Esen Buqa died of natural causes in 1462, after a khanship of thirty-three years. His death caused a split amongst the Moghuls; in the west Yunus Khan gained power, while in the east Esen Buqa's son Dost Muhammad became khan.

Esen Buqa is also known for giving refuge to two brothers, Jani Beg and Kerei against the Uzbeks. The friendship between the khan and these two brothers, would eventually found the Kazakh Khanate, marked the beginning of friendly relations between the Moghuls and the Kazakhs for the next several decades.

== Progeny ==
Esen Buqa had one son and two daughters:

- Dost Muhammad Khan;
- Daulat Nigar Khanum, married to Muhammad Haidar Mirza Dughlat;
- Husn Nigar Khanum, married to Mirza Abu Bakr Dughlat;

Preceded by Uwais Khan	Moghul Khan; 1429–1462	Succeeded by Yunus Khan and Dost Muhammad
