= Belgutei =

Half-brother of Genghis Khan (c. 1161-c. 1271)

Mongolian name
- Mongolian Cyrillic: Бэлгүдэй
- Mongolian script: ᠪᠡᠯᠭᠦᠲᠡᠢ
Transcriptions
- SASM/GNC: Belgüdej; Belgüdei

- Traditional Chinese: 孛兒只斤·別勒古臺
- Simplified Chinese: 孛儿只斤·别勒古台
Transcriptions
Standard Mandarin
- Hanyu Pinyin: Bèi'érzhǐjīn Biélègǔdái
- Wade–Giles: P‘ei-erh-chih-chin P‘ieh-le-ku-t‘ai

Alternative Chinese name
- Traditional Chinese: 別里古臺
- Simplified Chinese: 别里古台
Transcriptions
Standard Mandarin
- Hanyu Pinyin: Biélǐgǔdái
- Wade–Giles: P‘ieh-li-ku-d‘ai

Belgutei (c. 1161 – c. 1271) was the son of Yesugei and Sochigel and half-brother to Genghis Khan. He also became general to Genghis Khan. Belgutei was considered a wise counselor and skilled diplomat, and was often used as a messenger by Genghis Khan. With Genghis Khan's blessing, Belgutei killed the champion wrestler of the Mongols, Buri Boko, by breaking his neck during a wrestling match. This was revenge for an earlier incident when Buri Boko had fought with Belgutei and slashed him with a sword. According to legend, Belgutei lived to an unusually old age. Rashid ad-Din claims he died aged 110, while the Yuanshi reports that he was still alive when Möngke Khan took the throne in 1251, making him around 90, which would make him one of the oldest men on the earth at the time.

== Ancestry ==
Yesugei Baghatur	Hoelun
Belgutei	Behter	Qasar	Hachiun	Temüge	Temüjin (Genghis Khan)	Börte
Jochi	Chagatai	Ögedei	Tolui
