= Hachiun =

Brother of Genghis Khan

Hachiun (Mongolian: Хачиун, also known as Hachiun Alchi Mongolian: Хачиун Алчи, Qachi'un, Qachi'un-elchi; born c. 1166) was a full-brother of Genghis Khan and the third child of Yesugei and Hoelun. The Secret History of the Mongols specifies that "when Temujin was 9 years old, Hachiun was five years old." As a child he received a prefix "Alchi" to his name and therefore was referred to as Hachiun-alchi, or Alchidai (diminutive form of "Alchi"). He probably had a son whose name was Ilchidey (Iljigdei).

If other brothers of Temujin, Hasar and Temuge, are frequently mentioned in the Secret History as devoted companions and supporters of the elder brother, the mentions of Hachiun are rare, not only in the accounts of political and public affairs, but also in regular dialogues of daily life. Therefore, there is an opinion that Hachiun might have died early as the chronicles describing the later affairs of Genghis Khan do not mention Hachiun. But he was still alive in 1207: when already a full-fledged ruler of the whole of Mongolia, Genghis Khan was arranging his state affairs, Hachiun received land possessions and subjects from his mighty elder brother the seventh in the hierarchy after their mother Hoelun and younger brother Temuge (as one household), 4 sons of Temujin and brother Hasar, in that order.

Hachiun was said to have very good relationship with his brother Hasar but a poorer one with Temüge. This might be due to preferential treatment of his younger brother in the form of land and power. Of all the brothers he might have had the firmest relationship with Temujin.

== Ancestry ==
Yesugei Baghatur	Hoelun
Belgutei	Behter	Qasar	Hachiun	Temüge	Temüjin (Genghis Khan)	Börte
Jochi	Chagatai	Ögedei	Tolui
Orda	Batu	Berke	Baidar	Guyuk	Kashin	Mongke	Hulegu	Kublai
The Golden Horde	Chagatai Khanate	Ilkhanate	Yuan dynasty
