= Qasar =

Brother of Genghis Khan

Khasar (/ˈkæsɑːr/; Mongolian: Жочи Хасар, romanized: Jochi Khasar, IPA: [ˈt͡ɕɔt͡ɕʰɪ ˈχasər]), was one of the three full brothers of Genghis Khan. According to the Jami' al-Tawarikh, his given name was Jochi and he got the nickname Khasar after his distinguished bravery. He was also called Khabht Khasar (Mongolian: Хавт Хасар [ˈχaɸtʰ ˈχasər]; lit. 'Deft Khasar') because he was skilled with a bow.

== Early life ==
Hasar, as a child, was thrown out of the Borjigin tribe along with the rest of the family by the Taichiud warlord Targhutai Hiriltug. Food was scarce and Behter, his older half-brother, and the eldest of all the sons of the late Yesugei, stole or kept food from his mother and siblings. Hasar and his brother Temüjin, who later became known as Genghis Khan, killed their half-brother Behter as he returned from a fresh hunt. After the defeat of Temüjin at Khalakhaljid Sands (1203), Hasar was lost and hid himself, along with his sons and followers, in the forest. Temüjin then gathered new adherents among the Mongols, tricked his rival Ong Khan with a fake message of surrender from his missing brother Hasar, and crushed the Keraites in late 1203.

== Military career ==
Granted territories by the khan, Genghis Khan's full brothers Qasar, Khajiun, and Temuge formed the Left Wing of the Mongol Empire in the eastern edge of Inner Mongolia, while Genghis Khan's three sons, Jochi, Chaghatai, and Ögedei, made up the Right Wing in the western edge. The Right Wing saw a significant expansion to the west but the Left Wing did not have so much land to conquer.

Qasar did conquer what would later be known as Korea and Manchuria, including Outer Manchuria in Russia (north of the modern day North Korea).

Hasar's mother, Hoelun defended him against accusations of disloyalty stemming from Teb Tengri, a shaman. Stiffened by his mother Hoelun and wife Börte, who saw Teb Tengri as threat to the dynastic succession, Genghis allowed Khasar and Temüge to kill Teb Tengri in a wrestling match.

Unlike the Right Wing where properties were equally divided, Temüge was favored over Khasar and Khachiun in the Left Wing. Hasar's ulus (people and secondarily, territory) was significantly smaller than Temüge's. His original territory was located to the west of the Khingan Mountains and was surrounded by the Ergune and Hailar rivers, and the Külün Mountain. After the conquest of China, Hasarid princes had at least two additional territories in Shandong and Jiangxi, respectively.

== Ancestry ==
Yesugei Baghatur	Hoelun
Belgutei	Behter	Qasar	Hachiun	Temüge	Temüjin (Genghis Khan)	Börte
Jochi	Chagatai	Ögedei	Tolui

== Descendants ==
The princely houses of Hasar, Hachiun, and Temüge tended to coordinate with the five powerful clans: the Jalayir, Khunggirad, Ikires, Uruud, and Mangghud. They were usually led by princes from Temüge's house. At Arigh Bukha's rebellion, the three princely houses supported Khubilai (Genghis Khan's grandson) under leadership of Temüge's grandson, Ta'achar.

Among Hasarid princes, the third family head Yesüngge is probably the most famous. He was a son of Hasar and succeeded his brother Yegü. He is the hero of the Yesüngge Inscription (formerly known as the Genghis Stone). The princely house was succeeded by Yesüngge's son, Esen Emügen, and then Emügen's son, Shigdür. Although Shigdür joined the rebellion against Khubilai led by Temüge's great-great-grandson Nayan, the princely house survived without confusion. The sixth head, Babusha, was given the title of Qi Wang by Khayishan Külüg Khan in 1307. Sources show that Qasarid princes continued to hold the title even after the Yuan dynasty collapsed. Hasar's descendants were effective in other parts of Mongol Empire. It is also claimed that one Qasarid prince was killed in order to protect the last Great Khan Toghogan-Temur from Ming troops.

Togha Temür, a descendant of Hasar, was the last powerful claimant to the throne of the Ilkhanate in the mid-14th century. The family was known as the Hasar (Qasar) clan. With the death of Togha Temür at the hands of the Sarbadars of northern Khurasan in the mid-1300s, it is possible that the surviving members of the Hasar (Qasar) clan escaped into the mountains of what is today Afghanistan, where their descendants maintained their clan name of Hasar, which evolved over time into Hasara or Hazaras. As the Hazara people do not have a written history of their own, nothing can be proven, but this theory is more likely versus the theory that the name Hazara comes from the Persian word for "one thousand," which is actually, "hezar (hezār هزار)." As these Il Khanate Mongols had converted to Shia Islam and married Persian-speaking Persian women, their children had been raised as Shia Muslims with a mixed Mongol-Persian characteristic. This explains the current culture of Hazaras people very well.

It is not clear what happened to Hasarid princes from the late Yuan dynasty to the middle 15th century because of the confusion caused by the collapse of the Yuan dynasty in China proper. Mongolian chronicles compiled from the 17th century to the early 18th century contain some records on Hasar's descendants but they are considered mostly unhistorical by historians. In particular, Altan Tobchi by Mergen Gegeen (not to be confused with Lubsandanjin's Altan Tobchi) exaggerated the influence of Hasarid princes as the author himself descended from Khasar. The Oirat ruler Esen Tayisi deported a body of the Horchin to Western Mongolia in 1446 and they became the Khoshuds.

It is widely accepted that Hasar's descendant Bolunai was a historical figure since his existence is confirmed in contemporary Chinese sources of 1463, 1467, and 1470. Mongolian chronicles say that Bolunai's brother Unubold killed Muulihai of the Ongliud, a descendant of Genghis Khan's half brother Belgütei. Another famous story about Unubold tells that he proposed to Mandukhai Khatun, a widow of Manduulun Khan, but that she chose the Genghisid infant Batu Möngke (Dayan Khan) over him.

Bolunai led the Horchin Mongols. His descendants ruled the Horchin, Jalayid, Do'rbed, and Gorlos of the Jirim League, the Aru Khorchin of the Juu Uda League, and the Dörben Heühed, Muu Mingghan, and Urad of the Ulaanchab League in the Manchu-led Qing dynasty's administration. Among them, Horchin princes established matrimonial relationship with the imperial family of Aisin Gioro at the early stage of the Manchu rise to power, and held top-ranking princely titles (hošoi cin wang) throughout the Qing Dynasty. The Dorbeds in Heilongjiang submitted to the Qing in 1624, and they were organized into a banner in Jirim league ruled by descendants of Hasar. The Gorlos banners were also ruled by descendants of Hasar.

== See also ==
- Mughal (tribe)
