= Rise of Genghis Khan =

Life events from 1162 to 1206

The Rise of Genghis Khan involves the events from his birth as Temüjin in 1162 until 1206, when he was bestowed the title of "Genghis Khan" (sometimes "Chinggis Khan"), which means "Universal Ruler" or "Oceanic Ruler" by the Quriltai, which was an assembly of Mongol chieftains.

== The Mongols prior to Genghis Khan ==
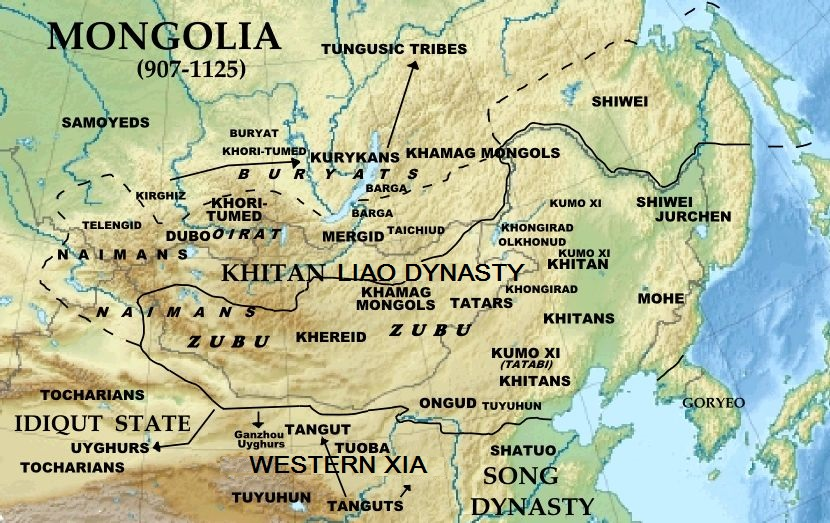
The locations of the Mongol tribes during the Khitan Liao dynasty (907–1125)

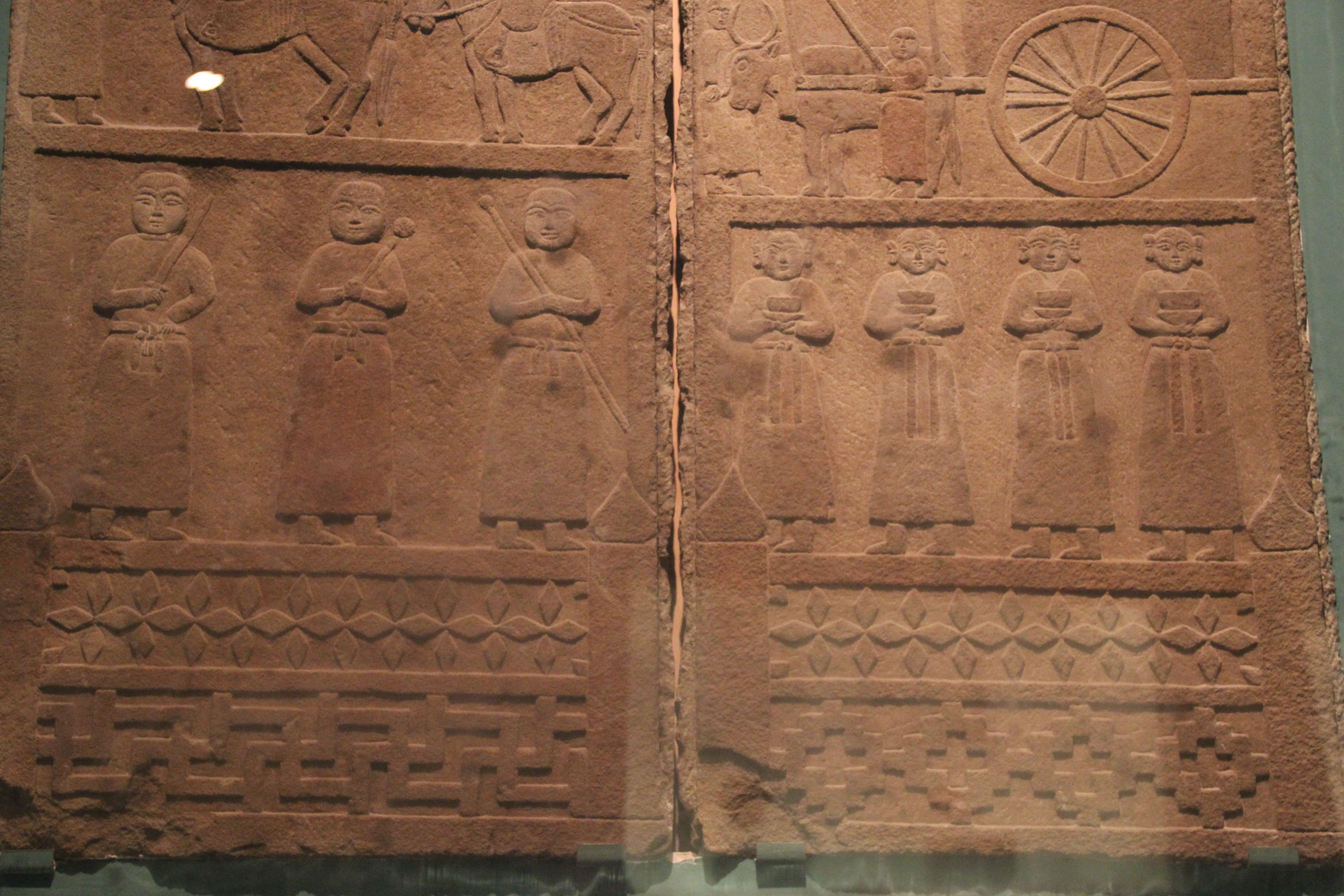
Khitan tomb relief

The Mongols first appeared in the dynastic history of the Tang dynasty and were described as a branch of the Shiwei, who were vassals of the Göktürks from 553 to 745. The Shiwei lived in the Lesser Khingan Range until the 10th century when the Mongol component moved to the Argun River and became vassals of the Khitans. The Mongols continued moving west until they reached the Onon River and Kherlen River in the 11th century.

Alternatively according to Mongol mythology, they were descended from a blue-grey wolf birthed by Heaven, and a fallow doe. Together they crossed a lake to reach Burkhan Khaldun where they gave birth to a human male. This human male, named Bat Tsagan, was the ancestor of all Mongols. In the 11th generation of Bat Tsagan's lineage, Dobun Mergen married a young woman named Alan Gho'a of the Khorilar. After Dobun Mergen died, Alan Gho'a gave birth to Bodonchar Munkhag, who founded the Borjigin clan.

Bodonchar's great-great-grandson Kaidu was born sometime during the 11th century and was the first khagan who "ruled all the Mongols". His grandson Khabul Khan was invited to the Jin court at one point and in a drunken outburst, tweaked the Jin emperor's beard. The emperor initially decided to let Khabul go unpunished but changed his mind and ordered his officials to have Khabul captured. The Jin pursuers were ambushed and killed, and Kaidu died shortly after, depriving the Jin any chance of revenge. Chinese sources make no mention of this incident.

From 1135 to 1147, the Mongols continuously raided Jin borders. The Jin retaliated and allied with the Tatars, who captured the new Mongol khan, Ambaghai of the Taichiud, under the pretense of making peace and handed him over to the Jin court. Before he was captured, Ambaghai managed to send a messenger back to his kinsmen, urging them to fight the Tatars to the death. Ambaghai was nailed to a wooden donkey and left to die. Around the time of Ambaghai's capture in the 1150s or 1160s, Khabul's grandson Yesugei abducted a Khongirad woman as his bride from the Merkits. He participated in a series of raids launched by Hotula Khan against the Tatars. Upon his return from one of these attacks, his wife gave birth to Temüjin, who would become Genghis Khan.

The Mengda Beilu records that the Mongols developed a profound hatred of the Jin because of massacres and atrocities that they committed in the late twelfth century. Whether these stories were real memories or a form of propaganda being used against the Jin is difficult to ascertain. Chinggis Khan certainly tried to unite other tribes to his cause by evoking their shared hatred of the Jin. On meeting the Khitan prince, Yelü Chucai, for instance, Chinggis Khan claimed that his war against the Jin was vengeance for their actions against the Khitan people.

— Lindsey Stephen Pow

== Childhood (1155/1162/1167-1177) ==
The year of Temüjin's birth is disputed and multiple dates are given by different historians: 1155, 1162 or 1167. However 1162 is the most accepted date. It is possible that Temüjin never knew the exact date of his birth. The Secret History records his birthplace as Delüün Boldog on the Onon River, but this has been placed at either Dadal in Khentii Province or in southern Agin-Buryat Okrug, Russia.

Genghis Khan was born as Temüjin to Yesugei, the leader of the Borjigin clan, and Hoelun of the Olkhonud tribe. In 1171, Yesugei took Temüjin east through Tatar territory to the Khongirad, who were closely related to the Olkhonud tribe of his wife, to arrange a future marriage between his son and Börte. Temüjin was left behind with the Khongirad to learn their ways, however Yesugei was poisoned by the Tatars during his return trip. Yesugei sent a trusted retainer called Münglig to retrieve Temüjin from the Khongirad, but he arrived too late to see his father alive. His father's followers scattered and Hoelun was left to care for her children by herself. She took them to the Khentii Mountains where they lived for several years eking out an existence through fishing and grubbing roots. Little is known about the events of Temüjin's life during these years except for three flashpoints. At one point Temüjin killed his half-brother Begter for stealing a fish. He then became the captive of the Taichiud and lived in a cage for some time before escaping with the help of a tribesman named Suldus Shira. In 1173, he became the blood brother (anda) of Jamukha from the Jadaran (Jajirad) clan. The Jadaran clan considered itself descended from the Borjigids, but others say they were an illegitimate offshoot of uncertain birth.

== Becoming khan ==
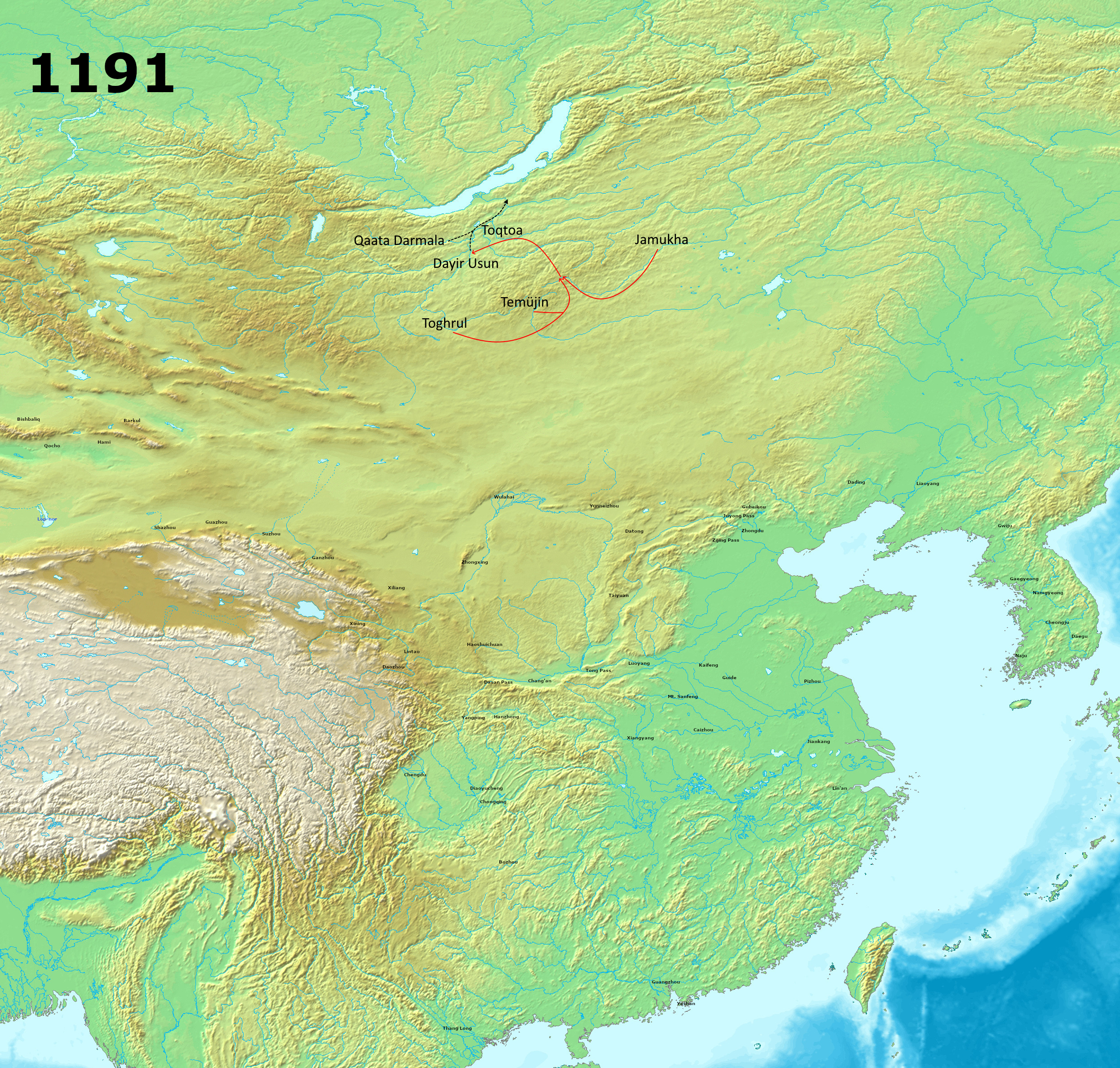
Temüjin and co. attack the Merkits in 1191

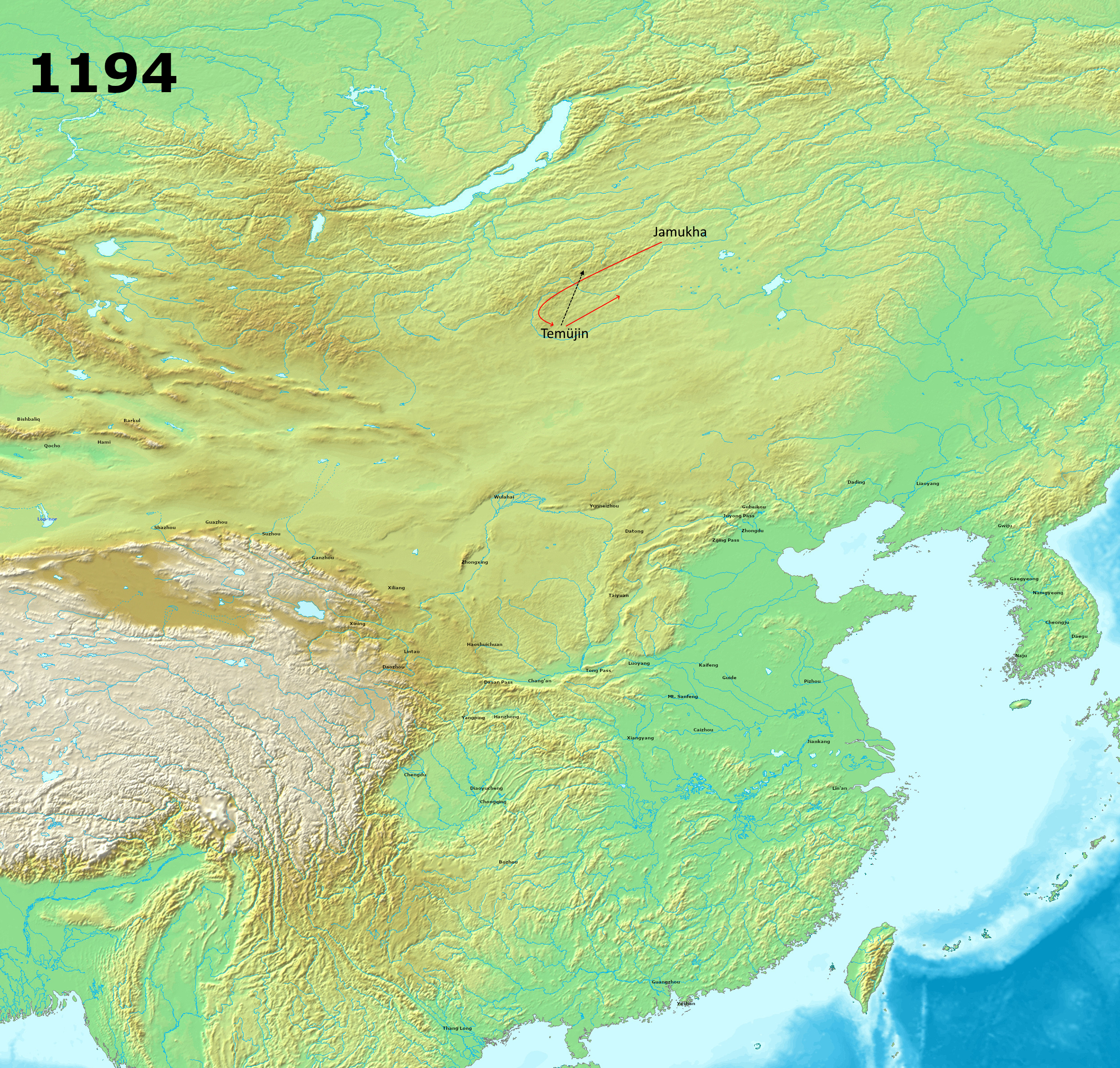
Temüjin and Jamukha's falling out, 1193-1194

=== Early leadership (1177-1191) ===
In 1177, Temüjin went back to the Khongirad and married Börte, but she was kidnapped shortly thereafter in a Merkit raid. Temüjin gathered 20,000 warriors and enlisted the help of his blood brothers Jamukha and Toghrul, the khan of the Keraites. Together they helped Temüjin get back Börte. It's not clear how she was returned or whether a military action was involved in the process. One version of events claim the combined forces routed the Merkit and she was rescued along with much booty, but this could have been a composite narrative combining a later military action with an earlier event. Börte gave birth soon afterwards and although the child may have been fathered by a Merkit, Temüjin decided to raise him as his own anyway, naming him Jochi.

The period of Temüjin's life from 1177 to 1191 is largely unknown except that Temüjin often fought the Taichiud, Salji'ut, Khadagin, and Tatars with mixed results. One of the clans following Temüjin eventually left and was defeated by the Taichiud, after which they joined Jamukha. During the 1180s there was a drought in Mongolia which increased conflict between the tribes but Temüjin only played a limited part in these affairs.

=== Attack on the Merkit (1191) ===
The previous attack on the Merkit that resulted in the rescue of Börte may have been a separate campaign that occurred in 1191, and was confused in the sources. In 1191, Jamukha, Temüjin, and Toghrul and his brother Jakha Gambhu decided to attack the Merkit. However Temüjin and Toghrul were late to the rendezvous area by three days, which greatly angered Jamukha. Together the 40,000 strong allied forces made a detour east to attack the enemy camp from the north-east. A fisherman spotted them and warned the Merkit of the impending attack, but the Merkit failed to make the necessary preparations, and dispersed.

=== Battle of Dalan Baljut (1187/1193) ===
Temüjin and Jamukha stayed together for a while after the battle. At one point they sent an embassy to the Khadagin and Salji'ut to try to win them over against the Taichiud. In 1187 or 1193, Temüjin and Jamukha split when retainers of the two camps clashed over horse thievery. Temüjin took with him 41 tribal leaders and 10,000 men from Jamukha and was elected khan by his followers in the following days. The Taichiud became frightened by Temüjin's power and joined Jamukha.

Jamukha assembled 30,000 men and moved in an arc from the north to flank Temüjin's position. The two forces were evenly matched but Temüjin's side suffered slightly worse than Jamukha, and was forced to retreat to a defensible pass called Jerene near the Onon River. Despite Jamukha's victory, his harsh treatment of captives disgusted his allies so much that they defected to Temüjin, bringing with them 10,000 men. With less than 20,000 men at his side, Jamukha was no longer able to challenge Temüjin on the upper Kherlen River, and retreated further east.

Modern historians such as Ratchnevsky and Timothy May consider it very likely that Temüjin spent a large portion of the decade following the clash at Dalan Baljut as a servant of the Jurchen Jin dynasty in North China. Zhao Hong recorded that the future Genghis Khan spent several years as a slave of the Jin. Formerly seen as an expression of nationalistic arrogance, the statement is now thought to be based in fact, especially as no other source convincingly explains Temüjin's activities between Dalan Baljut and c. 1195. Taking refuge across the border was a common practice both for disaffected steppe leaders and disgraced Chinese officials. Temüjin's reemergence having retained significant power indicates that he probably profited in the service of the Jin. As he would later go on to overthrow that state, such an episode, detrimental to Mongol prestige, was omitted from all their sources. Zhao Hong was bound by no such taboos.

== Rise to power ==
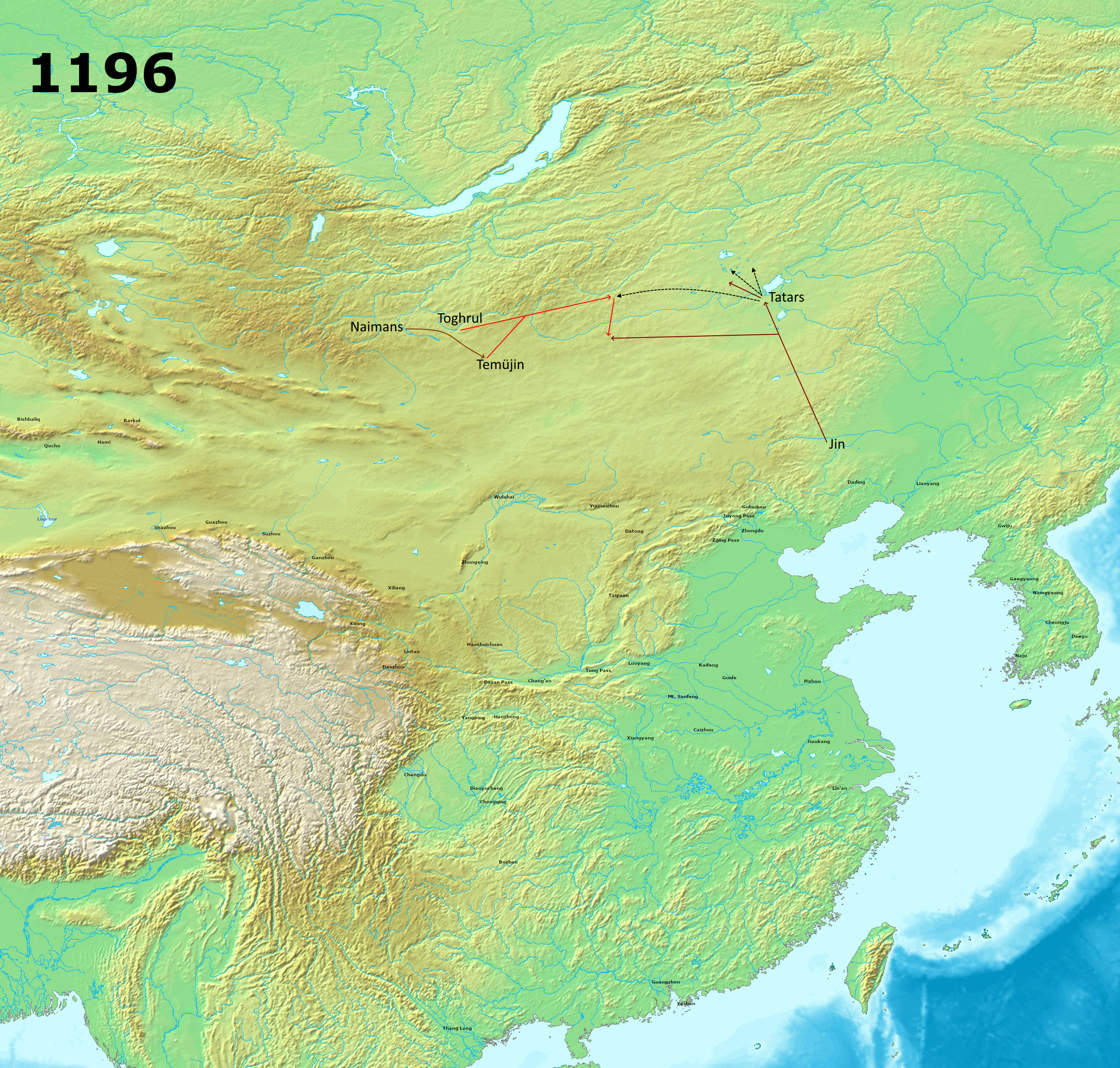
Temüjin allies with the Jurchen Jin dynasty against the Tatars while the Naimans take advantage of the situation to attack Temüjin, 1196.

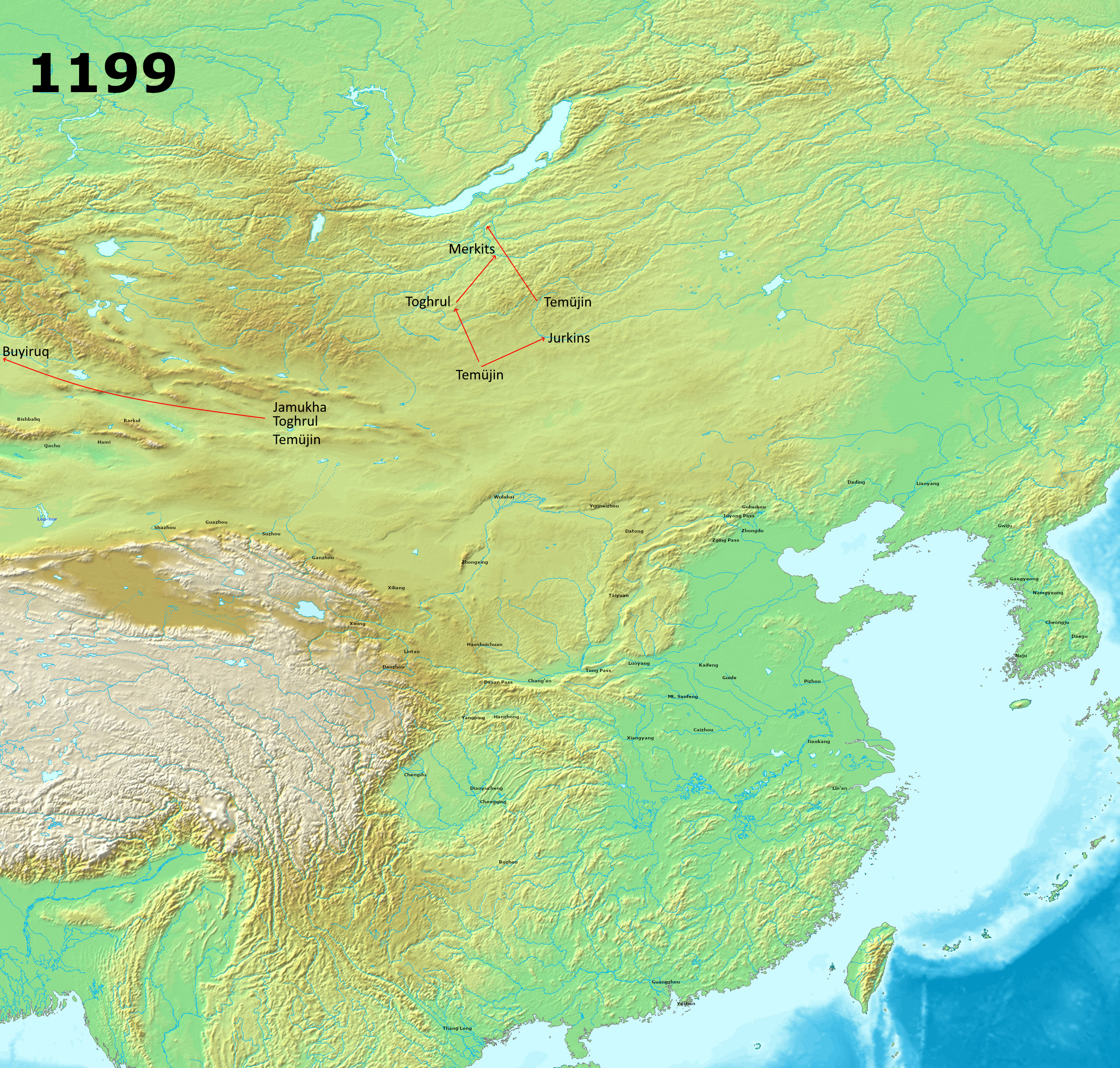
Temüjin and Toghrul drive the Merkits further north and attack the Naimans to the west, 1199

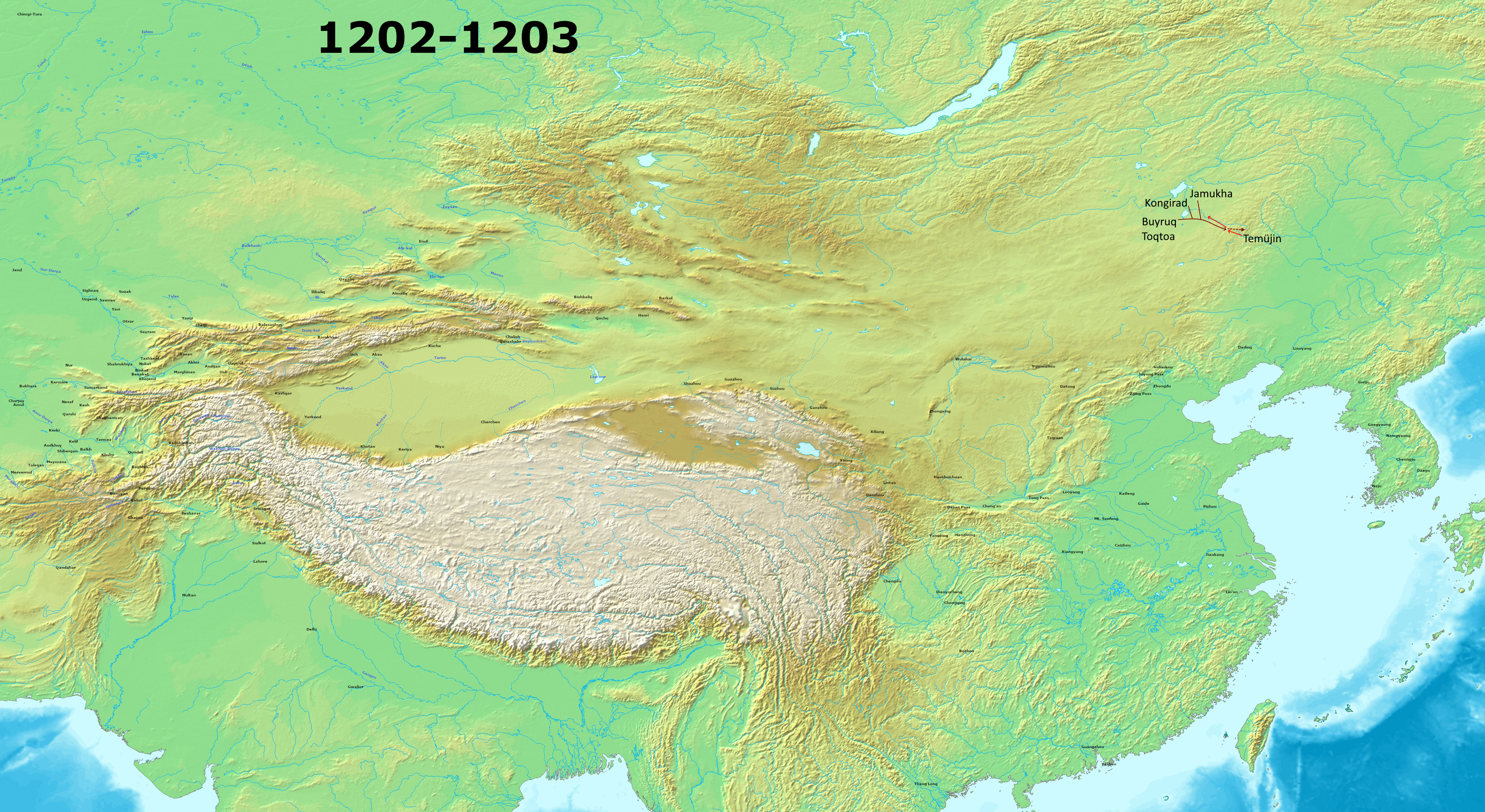
Buyruq khan assembles a large coalition against Temüjin but the attack fails, 1202-1203

=== Initial victory over the Tatars (1195-1196) ===
In 1195, the Jurchen Jin dynasty allied with the Tatars to attack the Khongirad. The resulting military operation was a success but the Tatar leader, Zuxu, quarrelled over the distribution of loot. Breakdown of communication led to a Jin attack on the Tatars in the following year. The Jin general Wanyan Xiang sent a vanguard detachment under Wanyan Anguo toward the Kherlen River, where they held off Tatar forces for three days before the main body of the Jin army arrived and defeated them.

The Khongirad had not forgotten their previous conflicts. On 4 February 1196, they struck deep into Jin territory and defeated a Jin detachment. Meanwhile, the Tatars fleeing Jin forces were intercepted by Toghrul and Temüjin. The beleaguered Tatars chose to fight in a makeshift barricade instead of on the open field, probably because they were much weaker than the opposing force. The resulting melee resulted in the complete defeat of the Tatars. Toghrul and Temüjin later met with Jin officials, who were extremely pleased with the destruction of the Tatars, and awarded them with titles. One of the Jin officials, a Khitan by the name of Yelü Ahai, was so impressed with Temüjin, that he and his brother Tuhua later defected to him in 1203.

Soon after the defeat of the Tatars, Toghrul was overthrown by his brother Erke Qara, who was backed by Inanch Bilge khan of the Naimans. A Naiman force entered Keraite territory and attacked Temüjin's camp, causing some damage. Toghrul fled to the Qara Khitai.

The defeated Tatar Zuxu submitted to the Jin and rebelled again in the same year. Zuxu submitted to the Jin again in 1198 and died soon afterward. Wanyan Xiang ordered the construction of extensive defensive works to protect sedentary population in the north. No further Jin campaigns against the steppe nomads were carried out with the same success as that of 1196.

=== Consolidating power (1196-1199) ===
Threatened by the Naimans' increasing influence, Temüjin sought help from the Jurkins to conduct a joint expedition against the Naimans. The Jurkins responded by killing Temüjin's envoys. Temüjin attacked them in 1196 and subjugated the majority of the Jurkins, including Muqali, who would later become one of the Mongol Empire's foremost generals. Toghrul's brother Erke Qara also joined Temüjin after he helped him drive off the Merkit. In 1197, Toghrul returned and re-established himself as leader of the Keraites with the help of Temüjin. In the winter of 1197–8, Temüjin eliminated the remaining Jurkins and executed their leaders.

From 1198 to 1199, Temüjin and Toghrul preyed on the Merkit, driving them ever further north. Toghrul chose not to share the booty with Temüjin, which upset him greatly.

=== Confronting the Naimans (1199) ===
Inanch Bilge khan died in 1198, splitting the Naimans between his two sons Tayang khan and Buyruq khan. In 1199, Temüjin, Toghrul, and Jamukha attacked Buyruq west of the Altai Mountains. Alarmed by the eastern invaders, Tayang sent a force under Kökse Sabraq, which intercepted Toghrul and took half his people hostage. Temüjin sent Muqali, Borokhula, Chilaun, and Bo'orchu to support the Keraites. They arrived in time to turn the tide of battle and routed the Naimans. Despite the victory in battle, the allied forces moved further east, possibly out of fear that the two Naiman factions might recoup and unite against them.

=== Defeating the Tatars and Naimans (1200-1202) ===
In 1200, Temüjin and Toghrul migrated eastwards along the Onon River into Taichiud territory and defeated the Taichiud in battle. Temüjin chased the fleeing Taichiud to a river crossing where he was surprised by a sudden counterattack that wounded him. The battle continued the next day until the Taichiud had been defeated. Next, the Khadagin, Salji'ut, Dorben, Tatar, and Khongirad tribes formed a coalition against Temüjin. The two sides engaged in a heavily contested battle that ended in retreat for Toghrul and Temüjin.

While Toghrul was incapacitated for two years, Temüjin recovered his losses and returned to wage war on the Tatars and Dorben while his brother Qasar attacked the Khongirad. Temüjin's enemies, especially, the Khongirad, then gathered around Jamukha and named him gur-khan in opposition to Temüjin. Jamukha's forces suffered a defeat against Temüjin in 1201, resulting in a brief defection by the Khongirad before they returned to fighting Temüjin the next year.

In 1202, Temüjin introduced new rules for distributing plunder. Several of his relatives disagreed with the new way of distribution and left with 10,000 men. In the same year Temüjin finished mopping up the Tatars. He intended to have all the Tatar captives executed, probably in revenge for his father, but his half-brother Belgutai leaked the information to the prisoners, who broke away and barricaded themselves on a hill. Temüjin's brother Qasar, whose wife was Tatar, also hid 500 captives who were supposed to be killed.

Buyruq khan assembled a large coalition army including even Jamukha and the Oirats numbering 70,000 strong. Together they advanced on Temüjin and Toghrul's position at Buir Lake. Temüjin and Toghrul moved their forces behind the Jin defensive fortifications. Both sides' forces were scattered and the weather took a turn for the worse with heavy snows and wind blasting the battlefield. Buryuq decided to retreat but got stuck in an open field at one point. The coalition army fell into confusion. Jamukha took the opportunity to plunder his allies' baggage. This came to be known as the Battle of Köyiten.

== Defeating rivals ==
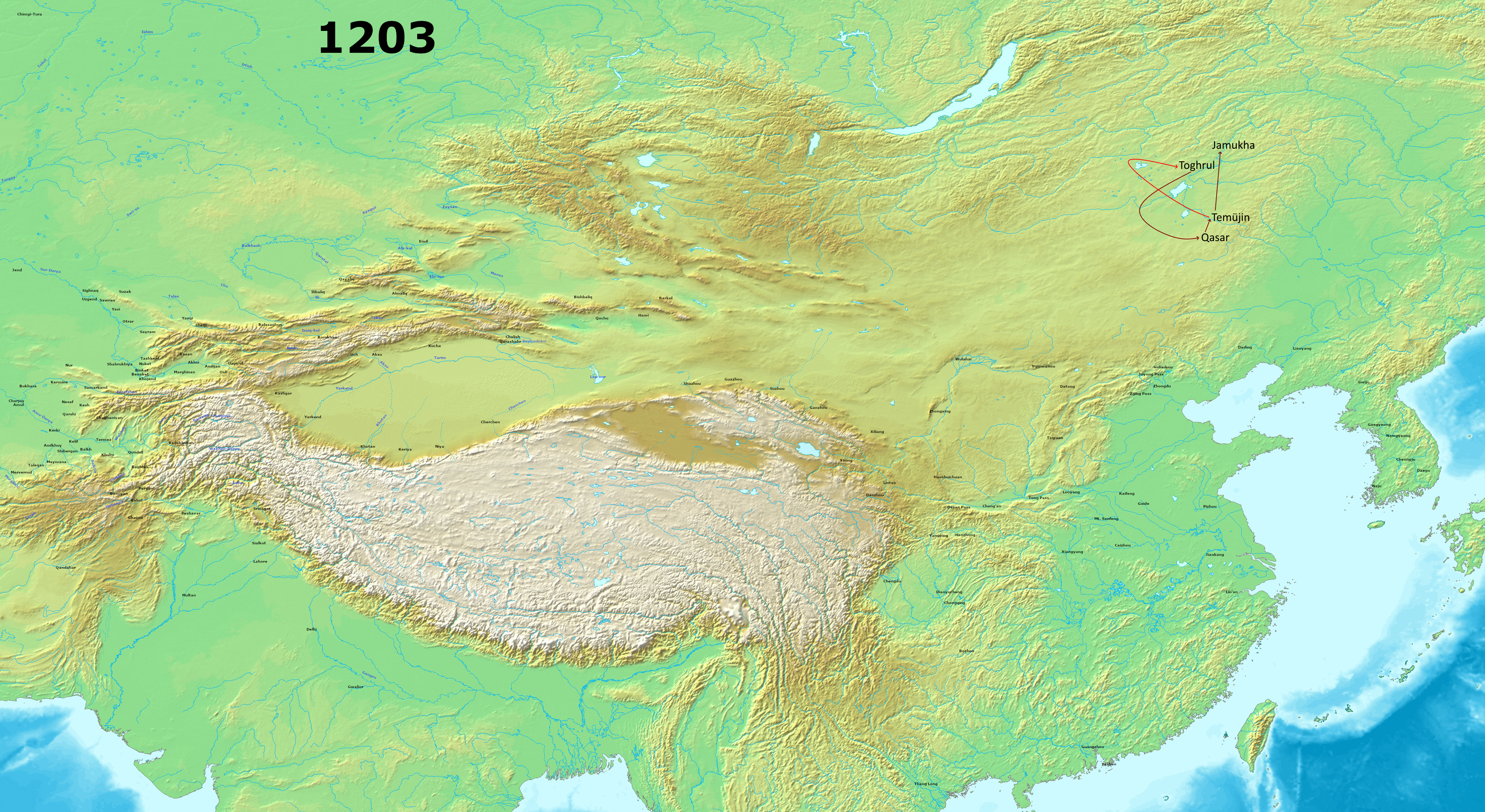
Toghrul attacks Temüjin with initial success, but his allies betray him, and the situation is reversed, 1203

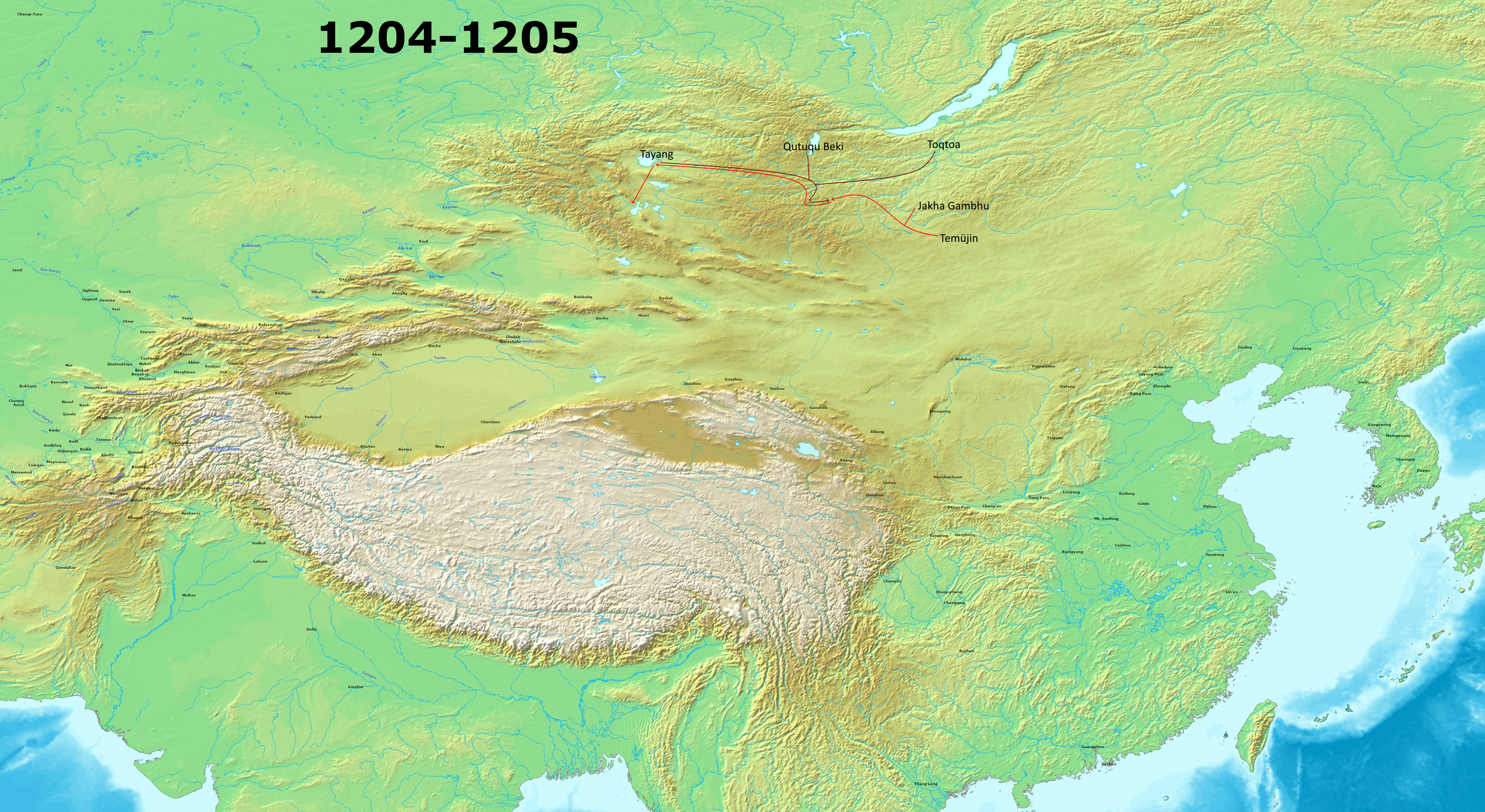
Temüjin defeats Tayang khan's Naimans, 1204-1205

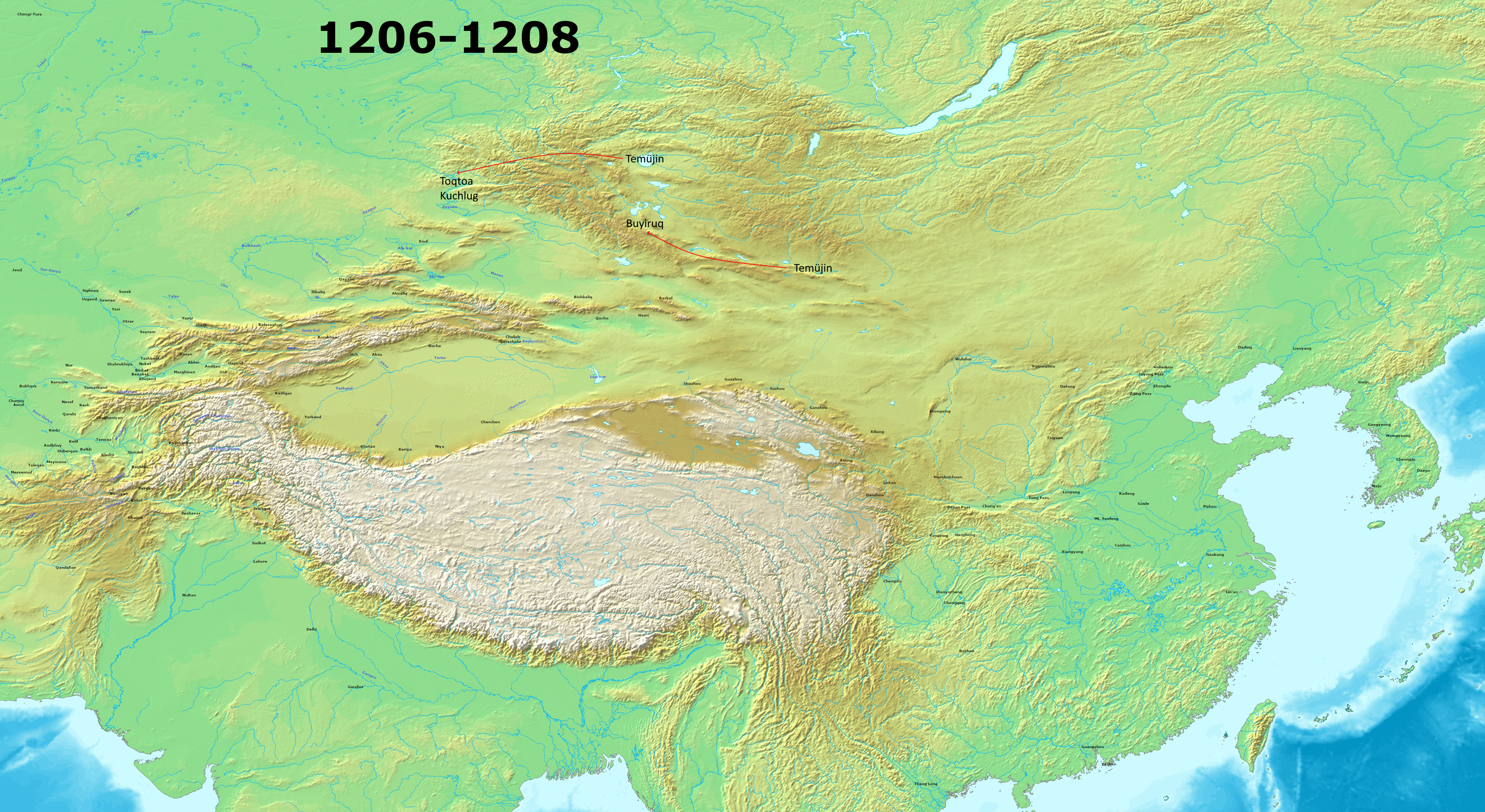
Genghis Khan finishes off the Merkits and Naimans, 1206-1208

=== Toghrul's betrayal (1203) ===
Toghrul's son Senggüm convinced his father to turn on Temüjin. They planned to ambush him while he was on his way to a wedding between the two families to cement their alliance, but a Keraite warned Temüjin beforehand and spoiled their plan. A battle ensued with Toghrul and Jamukha taking the offensive by attacking Qasar and defeating his army. Qasar escaped but most of his family was captured. Next they advanced on Temüjin, surprising him from the south, but Temüjin managed to move to a smaller enclosure to nullify the enemy's superior numbers. Senggüm was wounded in battle, throwing his forces into confusion, and allowing Temüjin to retreat. Toghrul decided not to give chase and returned to camp. This came to be known as the Battle of Qalaqaljit Sands. After this heavy defeat, Temüjin and the leaders of his remaining followers –a socially, culturally, and religiously heterogeneous mixture of people– swore an oath of brotherhood which became known as the Baljuna Covenant.

Meanwhile, Jamukha and a large portion of Toghrul's allies decided to split from him. When Toghrul caught wind of this, he attacked them, and some of them defected to Temüjin. By autumn of 1203, the situation between the two sides had been reversed, Temüjin's forces numbered more than 40,000 while Toghrul had barely half of that. Temüjin scouted out Toghrul's camp under false pretenses of defection by Qasar. When Toghrul's location had been ascertained, Temüjin's army rode through the night and surrounded the Keraite camp. The Keraites fought for three days before they surrendered. Toghrul fled the battle only to be killed by a Naiman called Qori Sübeči who did not believe his identity. Senggüm fled to Western Xia.

=== Defeating Tayang khan (1204) ===
Jamukha, the Merkits, and Keraites joined Tayang khan's Naimans in opposing Temüjin. By this time, Temüjin had 66,000 fighting men and moved most of them west in May 1204 to confront Tayang in what became the Battle of Chakirmaut. Supposedly Naiman scouts were unimpressed with the quality of Temüjin's troops, but Tayang wanted to retreat beyond the Altai Mountains to fight a war of attrition. Tayang's son Kuchlug as well as his senior officer argued against it and convinced Tayang to take the offensive against Temüjin. The opposition coalition forces crossed the Orkhon River but fell back to the foot of a mountain upon encountering Temüjin's forces. Temüjin ordered his army to stand in "lake" battle formation and to fight a "chisel" battle. His army dispersed in a long line as if to outflank the Naimans, which the Naimans responded by dispersing their own forces as well. Having deceived the Naimans into believing that he was going for a flanking maneuver, Temüjin led a frontal assault followed by the main army led by Qasar, driving the Naimans back to a mountain. Jamukha deserted the Naimans, who rejected Temüjin's offer of surrender and fought for another day until they were all killed. Tayang fell in battle.

Kuchlug had been left to defend a rear camp. When Temüjin's army came upon him, Kuchlug fled with a few followers. Jamukha was caught soon afterward, delivered to Temüjin, and executed.

=== Defeating Toqtoa (1205) ===
Toqtoa's Merkits fled southwest of Khovd and moved even further west when Temüjin moved against him. Toqtoa and Kuchlug joined Buyruq khan west of the Altai. The Uvas Merkits tried to defect to Temüjin, but Temüjin considered them too weak to be of use and did not want to integrate them, so they rebelled and took some supplies with them. The other Merkits either surrendered or were killed by 1205. One of the captured was Töregene, who married Ögedei. She became regent of the Mongol Empire when her husband died in 1241.

=== Raiding Western Xia (1205) ===
In April 1205, Temüjin made his first major incursion on a non-Mongol power, the Western Xia. The Khitan, Yelü Ahai, who defected to Temüjin some years ago led the way, ostensibly in search for Senggum, Toghrul's son. The Xia armies dared not fight the Mongols on the open field and made no move against them. The Mongols moved unopposed, plundering the open country, and destroying a few fortifications. After they left in June, the Xia rebuilt the places destroyed. In December a counter-raid was organized by the Xia but ultimately no attack was made. Soon after Senggum was killed in battle.

== Genghis Khan (1206) ==
In the summer of 1206, the shaman Kokochu proclaimed Temüjin Genghis Khan (Chinggis Khan), the "Universal Ruler", at the Onon River. Genghis reorganized Mongol society into a military force based on units of a thousand known as mingghan. These were not only military units but also household units and used for taxation purposes. His family members, the altan urugh or Golden Kin, were given territory and assigned these mingghan. A 10,000 strong bodyguard unit known as the keshig was formed from the sons of commanders to ensure their loyalty to Genghis.

In the winter, Genghis ambushed Buyruq while he was out hawking and killed him. Toqtoa and Kuchlug fled up along the Erdis River. In 1207, Genghis sent his son Jochi to subdue the Oirats and Kyrgyz people west of Lake Baikal. They submitted voluntarily, adding 20,000 warriors to the Mongol army.

== Bibliography ==
- Atwood, Christopher P. (2004), Encyclopedia of Mongolia and the Mongol Empire, Facts On File
- Biran, Michal (2012). Genghis Khan. Makers of the Muslim World. London: Oneworld Publications. ISBN 978-1-78074-204-5. Archived from the original on 2023-06-11.
- Broadbridge, Anne F. (2018). Women and the Making of the Mongol Empire. Cambridge Studies in Islamic Civilization. Cambridge: Cambridge University Press. ISBN 978-1-1086-3662-9.
- Cleaves, Francis Woodman (1955). "The Historicity of The Baljuna Covenant". Harvard Journal of Asiatic Studies. 18 (3): 357–421. doi:10.2307/2718438. JSTOR 2718438.
- Fitzhugh, William W.; Rossabi, Morris; Honeychurch, William, eds. (2009). Genghis Khan and the Mongolian Empire. Washington: Mongolian Preservation Foundation. ISBN 978-0-2959-8957-0.
- Jackson, Peter (2017). The Mongols and the Islamic World: From Conquest to Conversion. New Haven: Yale University Press. ISBN 978-0-3001-2533-7. JSTOR j.ctt1n2tvq0.
- Man, John (2004). Genghis Khan: Life, Death and Resurrection. London: Bantam Press. ISBN 978-0-3129-8965-1.
- Man, John (2014). The Mongol Empire: Genghis Khan, His Heirs, and the Founding of Modern China. London: Penguin Random House. ISBN 978-0-5521-6880-9.
- May, Timothy (2018), The Mongol Empire, Edinburgh University Press
- Morgan, David (1986). The Mongols. The Peoples of Europe. Oxford: Blackwell Publishing. ISBN 978-0-6311-7563-6.
- Morgan, David (1990). "ČENGĪZ KHAN". Encyclopædia Iranica. Vol. V. pp. 133–135.
- Mote, F. W. (2003), Imperial China: 900–1800, Harvard University Press, ISBN 978-0674012127
- Peers, Chris (2015), Genghis Khan and the Mongol War Machine, Pen & Sword Military
- Ratchnevsky, Paul (1991). Genghis Khan: His Life and Legacy. Translated by Thomas Haining. Oxford: Blackwell Publishing. ISBN 978-0-6311-6785-3.
- Sverdrup, Carl Fredrik (2017), The Mongol Conquests: The Military Operations of Genghis Khan and Sube'etei, Helion & Company Limited
- Twitchett, Denis (1994), "The Liao", The Cambridge History of China, Volume 6, Alien Regime and Border States, 907-1368, Cambridge: Cambridge University Press, pp. 43–153, ISBN 0521243319
- Weatherford, Jack (2004). Genghis Khan and the Making of the Modern World. New York: Crown Publishing Group. ISBN 978-0-307-23781-1.
