= Buyruq Khan =

Buyruq khan 不欲鲁汗

Khan of Southern Naimans
- Reign: c. 1198–1206
- Predecessor: Inanch Bilge khan
- Successor: Kuchlug
- Died: 1206
- Clan: Güčügüt
- Father: Inanch Bilge khan
- Religion: Nestorianism

Buyruq khan (Chinese: 不欲魯汗; pinyin: Bùyùlǔ Hàn) — was the younger son of Inanch Bilge and a brother of Tayang khan.

== Reign ==
After his father's death, he split off with a faction of Naimans to rule just south of the Altai Mountains, near the source of the Ulungur river, while his brother Tayang Khan remained in the heart of the Naiman homeland between the Black Irtysh and Bukhtarma rivers. He was present in kurultai where Jamukha was elected Gurkhan in 1201. According to a story, he, along with the Oirat chief Quduqa Bäki, used a jada or "thunder stone" to unleash a powerful storm on Genghis' army. But the magical ploy backfired when an unexpected wind blew the storm back at Quduqa. Buyruq, troubled by this storm, left the alliance and retreated to the south side of the Altai Mountains.

He was soon attacked by Keraites led by Toghrul in 1202, in alliance with Genghis on shores of Soqoq-Usun river (in modern Ulaangom). Caught unprepared, Buyruq fled and crossed Altai, arriving at Ulungur river. Buyruq's general Kökse Sabraq attacked Toghrul who moved away from Genghis, defeated Toghrul's son Senggüm, capturing his son and wife in process.

Following Buyruq's defeat in 1202, he joined forces with Kerait prince Jaqa Gambu, Jamukha, Toktoqa (chief of Merkids), and Quduqa (chief of Oirats) as well as Kuchlug. However he was ambushed by Genghis' forces while hunting in 1206. His nephew Kuchlug then took over the Naiman leadership.
