= Cyriacus Buyruk Khan =

Qurchaqus
- Khan of Keraites

Khan of Keraites
- Reign: 1150 - 1165
- Predecessor: Sarigh Khan
- Successor: Toghrul
- Died: 1165
- Spouse: Ilma; Töre Qaimish
- Issue: Toghrul; Erke Qara; Jakha Gambhu
- Dynasty: Keraite
- Father: Marqus Buyruk Khan

Qurchaquz Buyruk Khan (Chinese: 忽兒察忽思不亦魯黑汗; pinyin: Hūercháhūsī Bùyìlǔhēi Hàn) was a 12th-century Nestorian leader of Keraites. He was a son of Marqus Buyruk Khan.

== Name ==
His name is written in The Secret History of the Mongols as Qurčaqus. According to Volker Rybatzki and Christoph Baumer its original form could be Cyriacus, a Syriac name. According to Lev Gumilev, however, the original form may be Gregorius (Gregory) instead.

== Reign ==
He succeeded Kerait ruler Sariq Khan (according to Timothy May, he was his father, while Isenbike Togan says Sariq was just pre-Christian name of Marcus Buyruk Khan) in 1150. He soon emerged as one of the dominant powers in the steppe following destruction of Liao Dynasty by Jurchens. However, this situation soon challenged by Merkits and Tatars who kidnapped his son Toghrul in 1135. He soon reorganized the khanate between his sons. Center was Karabalgasun, while Toghrul ruled western part of the khanate as a subordinate to his uncle Gurkhan. His other sons Tai Temür Taishi and Yulamacus (as his subordinate) respectively granted Karaa and Boroo river banks, on the east. He soon died in 1165, his son not approving his division, claimed the throne for himself as his eldest son and sole ruler.

== Family and descendants ==
He was married to a certain woman called Ilma who bore him Toghrul and Töre Qaimish, a daughter of Naiman ruler Betegin Oba Kötürchi Buyruq Khan. According to Jami at-Tawarikh, Töre Qaimish was engaged in witchcraft. Being worried about this, Cyriacus ordered one of his concubines to kill her. Then, wishing to hide this fact, under a suitable pretext, he killed both of his concubines.

He had many sons including Toghrul, Erke Qara, Tai Temür Taishi, Yulamacus, Jakha Gambhu and Buqa Temür. Through his granddaughter Sorghaghtani Beki, he became an ancestor of the Chinggisids Toluids - rulers of the Ilkhanate and the Yuan dynasty.

Marcus Buyruk Khan
Cyriacus Buyruk Khan
Toghrul	Tay Temür	Buqa Timur	Erke Qara	Jakha Gambhu
Genghis Khan
Toqto'a Beki	Kharaun Khabchal	Ilga Senggüm	Uyku or Abaqu
Churchedai	Ibakha Beki	Begtütmish	Jochi	Sorghaghtani Beki	Tolui
Chilaun	Doquz Khatun
Hulagu Khan
