= Battle of Chakirmaut =

Battle of Genghis Khan's unification of the Mongol tribes

- Part of the Uniting the Mongol confederations
| Date | 1204 |
| Location | Foot of Mount Naqu, Altai Mountains (Mongolia) |
| Result | Victory for Temujin • Fall of Naiman khanate |

Belligerents
| Temujin's forces | Jamukha's forces; Naimans; Merkits; Keraites |

Commanders and leaders
| Temujin | Tayang Khan †; Kuchlug; Jamukha (executed) |

Strength
| About 66,000 men | More than Temujin |

Casualties and losses
| Low | Heavy |

The Battle of Chakirmaut was the concluding battle of Genghis Khan's unification of the Mongol tribes. Temujin, as Genghis was then known, fought and defeated the combined forces of coalition of tribes led by the Naimans under Tayang Khan and his son Kuchlug and rival Khan claimant Jamukha. Tayang Khan died in battle, Kuchlug fled with a small force, and Jamukha retreated but was later captured and executed.

== Notable events ==
- Jebe shot Genghis Khan in the neck. This event later made Jebe an early follower of Genghis.

== Sources ==
- Turnbull, Stephen (21 November 2003). Mongol Warrior 1200–1350. Osprey Publishing. ISBN 978-1-84176-583-9.
- May, Timothy (2016). The Mongol Empire: A Historical Encyclopedia. Vol. 2. ABC-CLIO. ISBN 9781610693400.
- Sverdrup, Carl Fredrik (2017), The Mongol Conquests: The Military Operations of Genghis Khan and Sube'etei, Helion & Company Limited
