= Qutuqtu =

Qutuqtu (Chinese: 忽覩都, Mongolian: Хутагт) was the second son of Tolui and Lingqun Khatun (daughter of Kuchlug). He was a grandson of Genghis Khan. Taking part in Ögedei Khan's invasion of Song, Qutuqtu was killed in battle against the Song general Meng Yu (孟珙).

== Family ==
Although Qutuqtu left no male descendants, he had a daughter, Kelmish Agha, who was instrumental in cementing the Yuan-Golden Horde alliance. Kelmish, married to Saljidai Gurkhan, gave birth to a daughter, Oljai Khatun. Oljai married Mengu-Timur (a descendant of Jochi) and gave birth to Toqta Khan of the Golden Horde.

Qutuqtu's full-sister, Ile Temür, married Pars Buqa, a grandson of Quduka Beki of the Oirat tribe.

== Ancestry ==
Ancestors of Qutuqtu

16. Bartan Baghatur
8. Yesugei
4. Genghis Khan
9. Hoelun
2. Tolui
10. Dei Seichen
5. Börte Ujin
11. Tacchotan
1. Qutuqtu
24. Inanch Bilge Khan
12. Tayang Khan
6. Kuchlug
3. Lingqun Khatun
28. Yelü Yilie
14. Yelü Zhilugu
7. Princess Hunhu
15. Juerbiesu
