= Inanch Bilge khan =

Inanch Bilge khan Инанч Билгэ хан

Khan of Naimans
- Reign: c. 1143–1198
- Predecessor: Narkysh Tayang
- Successor: Taibuqa (near Lake Zaysan); Buyruq khan (in Altai)
- Died: 1198 or 1202
- Spouse: Juerbiesu
- Issue: Taibuqa; Buyruq khan
- Clan: Güčügüt
- Religion: Nestorianism

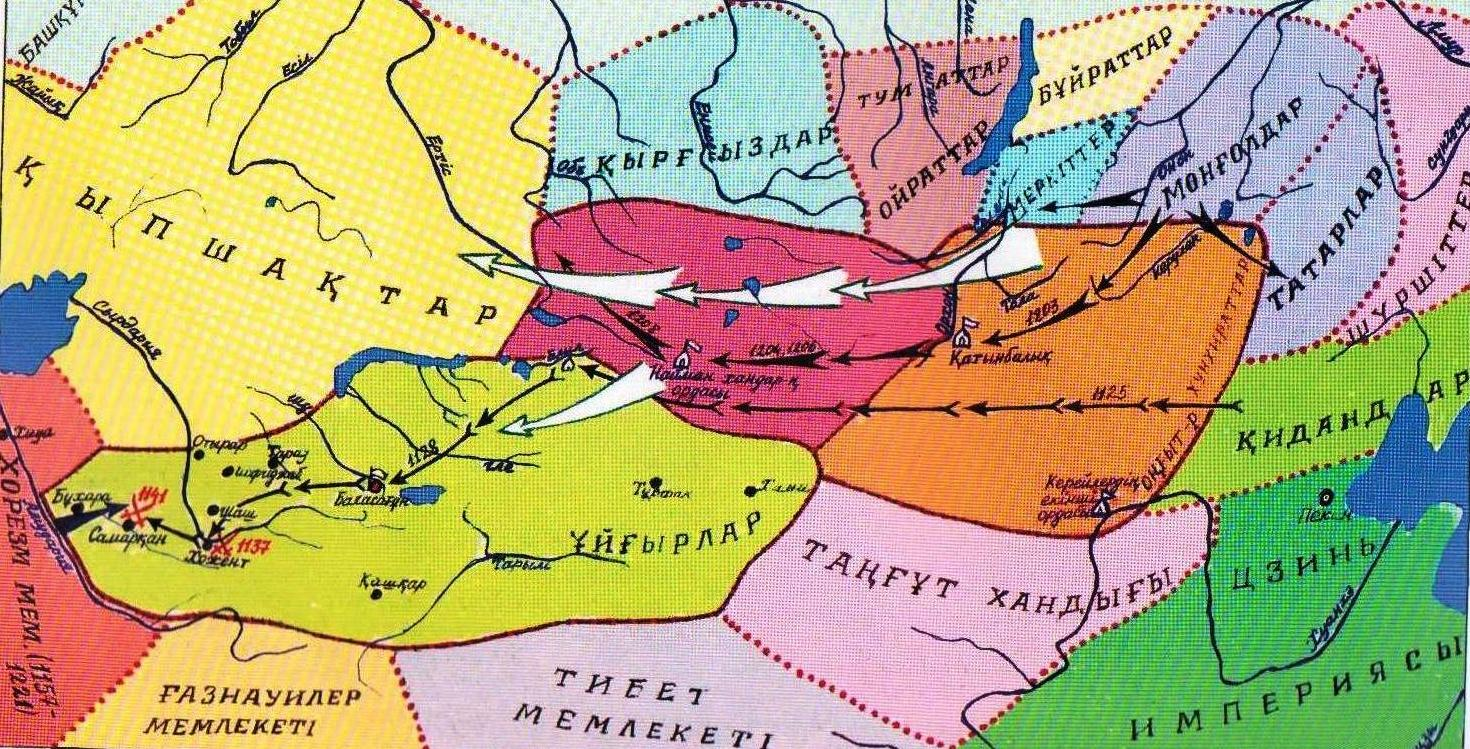
Naimans and neighbours during reign of Inanch khan (in middle)

Inanch khan (Mongolian: Инанч хан, Chinese: 亦難赤汗; pinyin: Yìnánchì Hán) or Inanch Bilge Bogü khan (Mongolian: Инанч Билгэ Бөгү хан, Chinese: 亦難赤必樂格卜古汗; pinyin: Yìnánchì Bìlègé Bógǔ Hán) or Inat khan was a khan of Naimans. According to Gumilev, his Christian name was John.

== Reign ==
He was from the Güčügüt clan of Naimans which followed the Betegin clan. He conquered Yenisei Kyrgyz with his elder brother Narkysh Tayang (Наркыш Таян, Naershi Tayang 納兒黑失太陽) and succeeded him later sometime. After Yelü Dashi's death 1143, he became independent. He supported Kerait ruler Toghril's brother Erke Qara against him in 1174.

After his death Naiman khanate were divided into two factions ruled by his sons.

== Family ==
He was married to Gürbesu (Гүрбэсү, 古兒別速) and several other wives with whom he had at least two sons:

- Taibuqa, also known as Tayang khan
- Buyruq khan

Gürbesu later married to his step-son Taibuqa in a levirate marriage.

== Character ==
He was reported be a man of honor among Naimans according to The Secret History of the Mongols.
