= Kuchlug =

Kuchlug Хүчлүг 屈出律

Emperor of the Western Liao dynasty
- Reign: 1211–1218
- Predecessor: Yelü Zhilugu
- Successor: Dynasty collapsed

Khan of Naimans
- Reign: 1204–1218
- Predecessor: Tayang Khan and Buyruq Khan
- Successor: Mongol conquest of the Qara Khitai
- Died: 1218; Badakhshan
- Spouse: Princess Hunhu
- Issue: Linqgun Khatun
Era name and dates
- Tiānxī (天禧): 1178–1218
- Dynasty: Western Liao
- Father: Tayang Khan
- Religion: Buddhism

Kuchlug (also spelled Küchlüg, Küçlüg, Güčülüg, Quqluq) (Mongolian: Хүчлүг; Chinese: 屈出律; d. 1218) was a member of the Naiman tribe who became the last emperor of the Western Liao dynasty (Qara Khitai). The Naimans were defeated by Genghis Khan and he fled westward to the Western Liao, where he became an advisor to his future father-in-law Yelü Zhilugu. He later rebelled, usurped the throne and took control of the empire, putting an end to the rule of the House of Yelü. He was killed in 1218 by the Mongols and the domain of the Western Liao was absorbed into the Mongol Empire.

While his predecessor Yelü Zhilugu was the last Qara Khitai emperor from the Yelü clan, Kuchlug is sometimes regarded as the final ruler of the Western Liao realm as he retained the dynastic title of "Great Liao" upon his ascension to the throne.

== Naiman origins and westward flight ==
Kuchlug was the son of Taibuqa, the Tayang khan (leader) of the Naimans, a Mongol-speaking tribe. In 1204, Jamuqa, the chief Mongol rival of Temüjin (later known as Genghis Khan), fled to the Naimans. Temüjin followed and launched an assault upon the tribe, resulting in the battle of the thirteen sides. Taibuqa at first hesitated, considering it better to fall back to the Altai Mountains and attack the Mongols from there. Kuchlug, however, favored a direct assault on the Mongols on open ground. He went so far as to dismiss his father's plan as cowardly. Taibuqa relented and allowed Kuchlug to carry out his attack.

The battle was a disaster for the Naiman. Jamuqa abandoned them and fled. Taibuqa was mortally injured, and his main commander was killed. The rest of the tribe surrendered to Temüjin and were absorbed into his ranks. Kuchlug managed to escape and with a few Naiman soldiers fled westward towards the Kara Irtysh.

Afterwards Genghis Khan was wary of the threat Kuchlug still posed. In 1208, they again met in battle, and Kuchlug was pushed further west into Zhetysu. Reeling from a second defeat at the hands of the Mongols, Kuchlug turned to the Qara Khitai based in Balasagun for protection.

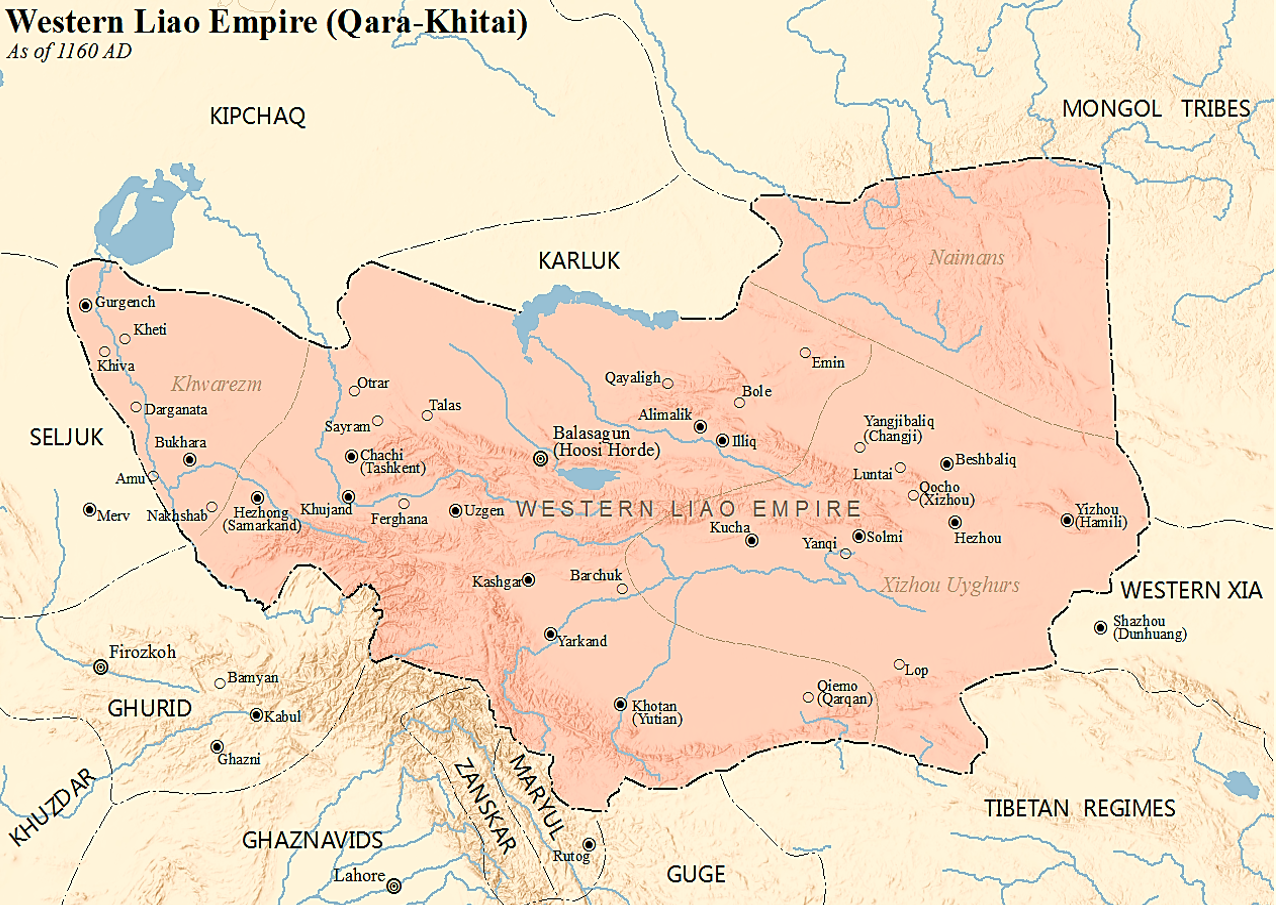
Map of the Qara Khitai empire with the Naimans located its north-east.

== Qara Khitai ==
Kuchlug was welcomed by Yelü Zhilugu, the emperor of the Qara Khitai (Western Liao dynasty). Once he was accepted into the empire, Kuchlug quickly gained a strong foothold. He found service as an advisor for Yelü Zhilugu, and eventually married one of Yelü Zhilugu's daughters, Princess Hunhu (渾忽公主). He was later given the title of Khan, and was allowed to reorganize his fellow Naimans into a military unit under his command.

=== Usurpation of the throne ===
Around that time, the Qara Khitai dynasty was dealing with rebellions in the east, as well as engaging in a struggle against Muhammad II of the Khwarazmian Empire in the west. The Khwarezm-Shah took Bukhara in 1207, but was defeated by the Qara Khitai at Samarkand. Kuchlug, however, apparently had formed an alliance with the Khwarezm-Shah. In 1210, while Yelü Zhilugu was dealing with a revolt by the Karakhanids at Samarkand, Kuchlug took the chance to rebel against his father-in-law, seizing the empire's treasury at Uzgen. Yelü Zhilugu left Samarkand to deal with Kuchlug, but the Khwarezm-Shah Muhammad used the opportunity to seize Samarkand, then defeated the Qara Khitai forces near Talas and gained control of Transoxiana.

Yelü Zhilugu pulled back to his capital at Balasagun and defeated Kuchlug who retreated eastward to his Naiman realm. However, in 1211, while Yelü Zhilugu was out hunting, he was ambushed and captured by Kuchlug. The Khwarezm-Shah then joined Kuchlug in capturing the Qara Khitai. Yelü Zhilugu was made taishang huang and Kuchlug became emperor of the realm. Many historians consider Kuchlug's usurpation of the throne in 1211 to be the end of the Qara Khitai, although the realm (which retained the official name of "Great Liao") would not fall until 1218.

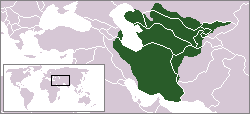
Khwarezmid Empire

=== Conflicts with Muhammad II ===
Once Kuchlug had established himself as ruler, Muhammad demanded the Qara Khitai Gur-khan to be handed over and a princess as a reward for his previous support. Kuchlug tried to stall, but eventually Muhammad became more aggressive. However, when Kuchlug threatened to resolve the rivalry by direct combat, Muhammad chose to evacuate the region of upper Jaxartes (Syr-Darya), demolished the settlements there in an attempt to form a buffer zone between his empire and Kuchlug's, and the Syr-Darya eventually came to be the de facto border between the two rulers.

=== Religious policy ===
Kuchlug was from the Naiman tribe, which were Nestorians. His wife, daughter of the Gur-khan, was a Buddhist, and convinced him to adopt Buddhism. However, in contrast to the policy of religious tolerance of the previous Qara Khitai rulers, once Kuchlug assumed power, he was reported to have instituted anti-Muslim policies. According to Persian historian Ata-Malik Juvayni, he demanded that a town’s Muslim population should make a choice between either converting to Nestorianism or Buddhism, or donning Khitan garment, of which the population would choose to wear Khitan clothing. He was also reported to have crucified the imam of Hotan onto the door of his madrassa.

== Downfall and death ==
Kuchlug attacked the city of Almaliq, and the Karlugs there appealed to Genghis Khan for help. In 1216, Genghis Khan dispatched his general Jebe to pursue Kuchlug. The Mongol first went to Almaliq, then proceeded on to the capital city of Balasaghun near which they defeated a Qara Khitai force of 30,000 men. Kuchlug fled southwards to Kashgar, however, his previous acts of pillaging and burning harvests in Kashgar when he first captured the town, his anti-Muslim policies, as well as the billeting of his troops on local households, had antagonized the people of Kashgar. When the Mongols approached Kashgar, Kuchlug, unable to find support in Kashgar, fled again. According to Ata-Malik Juvayni, the people of Kashgar, then killed his soldiers. He continued south across the Pamirs, eventually reaching the border between Badakhshan and Wakhan in 1218. There, a group of hunters caught him and handed him over to the Mongols. Kuchlug was beheaded, and according to the Chinese historical work Yuan Shi, his head was displayed across his former realm. His daughter Linqgun Khatun was made a wife of Tolui and bore him his son Qutuqtu.

== See also ==
- Mongol invasion of Central Asia
