= Tayang Khan =

Tayang khan 塔陽汗
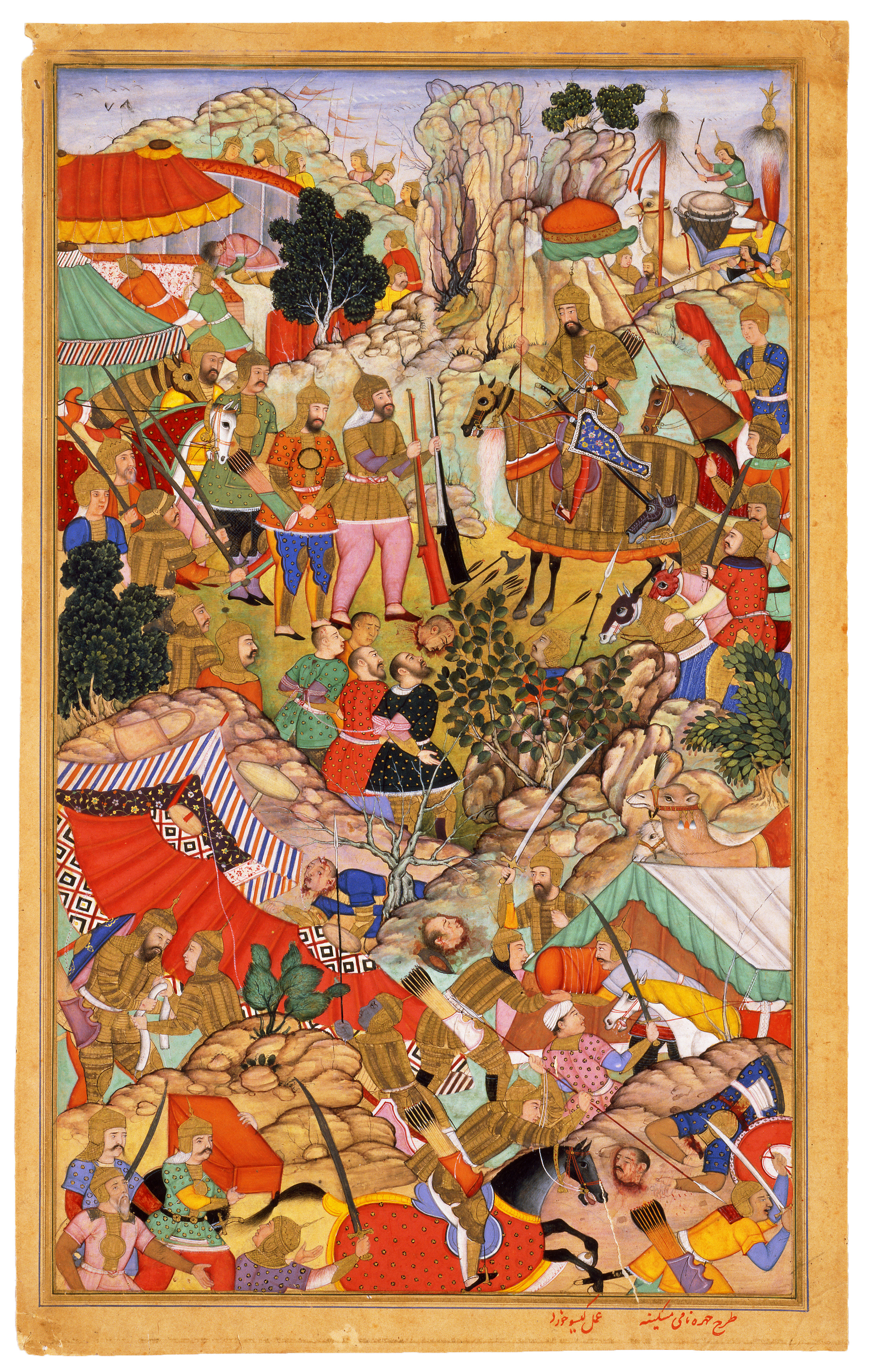
- Tayang Khan presented with the head of Toghril (1596)

Khan of Northern Naimans
- Reign: c. 1198–1204
- Predecessor: Inanch Bilge khan
- Successor: Kuchlug
- Born: Taibuqa (脱兒魯黒)
- Died: 1204
- Spouse: Gürbesu (古兒別速)
- Issue: Kuchlug
- Clan: Güčügüt
- Father: Inanch Bilge khan
- Religion: Nestorianism

Tayang Khan (Mongolian: Таян хан; Chinese: 塔陽汗; pinyin: Tǎyánghàn; Persian: تايانك خان) was a khan of the Naimans. According to The Secret History of the Mongols, he was physically weak when he was born and his father Inanch Bilge did not believe his son would survive to adulthood, therefore he was also called Torluq Tayang (Weak Tayang).

== Reign ==
He succeeded his father sometime around 1200. He married his own stepmother Gürbesu in a levirate marriage. His elder brother was Buyruq Khan. His horde was living around the shores of the Black Irtysh.

In 1200, he helped a brother of Toghrul, a Kerait prince Jaqa Gambu (also known as Kereyidei), who fled to Tayang Khan. After a defeat in 1203 by Genghis Khan, Toghrul escaped to Naiman territories. A Naiman patrol named Qori Sübeči did not recognize him and executed him on the spot. When Tayang was presented with the head of Toghrul, he stepped on it, crushing it. Seeing the once powerful Toghrul's defeat, he decided to act against Genghis first against council of his khatun Gürbesu and general Sabraq.

In 1203, he tried to reach Alaqush Tegin of Ongud, a fellow Nestorian lord ruling north of Shanxi to march on Genghis together. However Alaqush informed Genghis beforehand of Tayang's march.

The armies first met on 17 May 1204 in the Khangai Mountains. Naiman patrols defeated a vanguard of Genghis' army. Genghis with a much lesser army, ordered all of his men to light five campfires per men around the tent. Naiman patrols investigated the large number of fires and informed Tayang. Tayang consulted his son Kuchlug about the next step, advising a retreat and a guerrilla war. Kuchlug however spoke arrogantly, insulted Tayang and accused him of being a coward.

An angered Tayang marched and crossed the Orkhon river the next day, where he was joined by the forces of Jamukha, Toktoqa (chief of Merkids) and Quduqa (chief of Oirats). Later they met Temujin's forces at the Battle of the thirteen sides. However, he soon retreated again upon seeing Jebe, Subutai, Khubilai and Jelme. Seeing his hesitation, Jamukha left the Naimans. Later the Naimans with fewer numbers were ambushed at night by Genghis. Tayang himself was killed whilst attempting to escape.

== Aftermath ==
His wife Gürbesu was captured by Genghis and made to be Genghis' wife, while his son Kuchlug escaped to Buyruq khan, Tayang's brother.
