= Beki =

Title of nobility

Beki is a title of nobility used by the Mongols and other steppe societies in the Central Asia in the medieval period. The exact meaning of the title is disputed, although possibly meant "honored shaman", and while frequently used for noble women, some men also used the title.
