= Sarsen Amanzholov =

Kazakh Turkologist

Särsen Amanjolūly Amanjolov (Kazakh: Сәрсен Аманжолұлы Аманжолов; Russian: Сарсен Аманжолович Аманжолов, romanized: Sarsen Amanzholovich Amanzholov; December 27, 1903 – January 28, 1958) was a Kazakh Turkologist, and one of the pioneers of Kazakh linguistics. He developed the foundations of Kazakh grammar, and helped create the current form of the Cyrillic Kazakh alphabet. Amanzholov also helped to create Russian-Kazakh military and agricultural dictionaries.

== Early life and career ==
Amanzholov was born in the village (aul) of Eginsu in East Kazakhstan Province. In 1916 he graduated from the Kanton-Karagae Russian-Kazakh school and enrolled in a real school in Ust-Kamenogorsk, but was forced to drop out due to financial difficulties. He later enrolled in a three-month course of study in Semipalatinsk, after which he returned to his home village to work as a teacher.

In 1924 he was offered a job as a high-ranking secretary in the executive committee of East Kazakhstan province. In 1926 he moved to Tashkent to work at the Central Asian State University in the department of Kazakh language and literature.

In the fall of 1931 Amanzholov began to teach at the Abay Kazakh Pedagogical Institute. The next year he became an associate professor. He would continue to work at this institution until his death nearly 30 years later. He died on 29 January 1958.

== Grammar and alphabet ==
In the early 1930s he began a program for creating Kazakh textbooks. In 1932 Amanzholov published the grade school textbook Kazakh Grammar (Russian: Грамматика казахского языка). That year he also edited a Kazakh language textbook for younger children. From 1934-1940 he wrote a grammar textbook for middle school students.

On November 10, 1940, at the 5th session of the Supreme Soviet of the Kazakh SSR, Amanzholov was presented with the project of creating a new Cyrillic alphabet for the Kazakh language. This alphabet would replace the Uniform Turkic Alphabet which was currently being used throughout the USSR.

== Military service ==
From February 1942 to June 1946 Amanzholov was placed on active war service in the Red Army. During that time he directed propaganda activities among soldiers of non-Russian origin, and published Notebook of a Red Army Propagandist (Блокнот агитатора Красной Армии) as well as leaflets about Heroes of the Soviet Union.

In 1948 he defended his dissertation on the ethnogenesis of the Kazakhs in Moscow.

East Kazakhstan State University is named in his honor.
