= Toghrul =

Mongol chieftain, khan of the Keraites (c. 1130–1203)

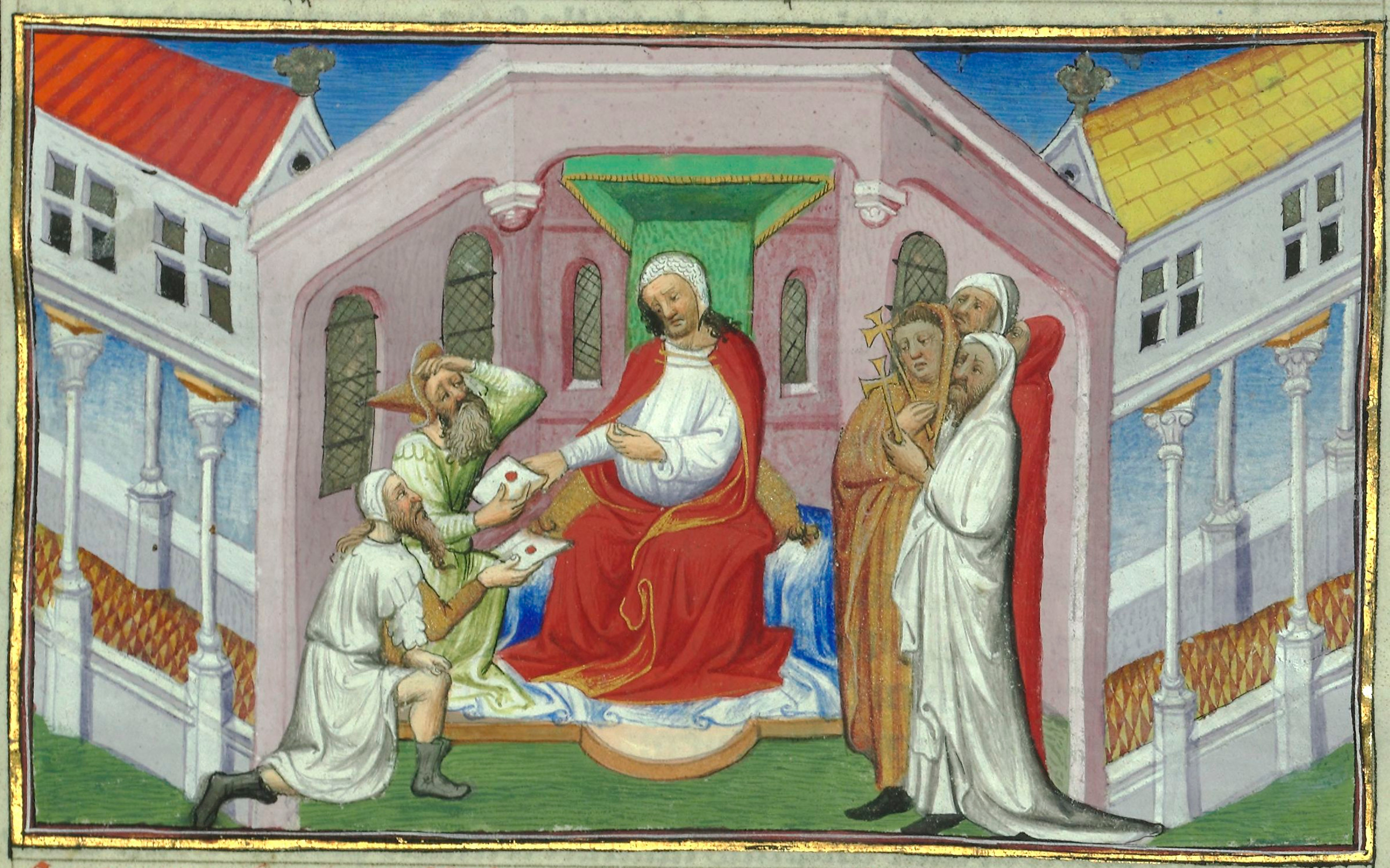
- Wang Khan "Toghrul" in Le Livre des Merveilles, 15th century. He is depicted with the gown of a Cardinal rather than a King, and with his attendants (right) holding Christian crosses, in relation to his identification with Prester John in the Occident. He is receiving two envoys from Genghis Khan (kneeling).

Khan of Keraites
- Reign: 1165–1194
- Predecessor: Cyriacus Buyruk Khan
- Successor: Erke Qara

Khan of Keraites
- Reign: 1198 – 1203
- Predecessor: Erke Qara
- Successor: Keraites Merged with Mongol Empire
- Born: c. 1130; Tuul River, modern-day Mongolia
- Died: 1203 (aged 72–73)
- Issue: Ilga Senggüm; Uyku
Regnal name
- Wang Khan (王汗)
- Mongol: ᠣᠩ ᠬᠠᠭᠠᠨ
- Dynasty: Keraite
- Father: Cyriacus Buyruk Khan
- Religion: Nestorian Christian (presumed)

Toghrul (Mongolian: Тоорил хан Tooril han; Chinese: 脫里), also known as Wang Khan or Ong Khan (Ван хан Wan han; Chinese: 王汗; pinyin: Wáng Hán; died 1203), was a khan of the Keraites. He was the blood brother (anda) of the Mongol chief Yesugei and served as an important early patron and ally to Yesugei's son Temüjin, later known as Genghis Khan. The main source on his life is the Secret History of the Mongols.

== Name ==
"Wang Khan" was the name given to Toghrul by the Jurchen-led Jin dynasty of China; Wang means king or prince. During the 13th century, Toghrul was one of several Asian leaders who was identified with the legend of Prester John, but also King David, a brother to John. Although the Keraites converted to Nestorianism, a sect of Christianity, early in the 11th century there is no credible proof that Toghrul was himself Christian as Mongolian sources say nothing about his religion.

== Early life ==
He was born around 1130, to a Nestorian family of Keraites. His father was Cyriacus Buyruk Khan, the leader of the Keraites. Toghrul had a very difficult youth. The Merkits captured him during his childhood and he was reduced to slavery. It is possible that he left the Merkit after being freed by ransom or simply escaped. However, according to the Secret History, he was again abducted at the age of thirteen by the Tatars, who also took his mother. When Toghrul returned to the Keraites later, his father was near death. Toghrul took his place and commanded the Keraites around 1165.

== Reign ==
In order to eliminate potential rivals, he started by killing his brothers between 1165 and 1171. One of them, namely Erke Qara managed to escape and fled to the Naimans, who were a neighboring tribe to the west of the Keraites. The two other brothers, Buqa-Timur and Tai-Timur Taïshi were executed. However, Toghrul's success was brief because his uncle only known with the title Gurkhan overthrew him. Toghrul fled with his daughter and a handful of faithful. He tried to get the help of the Merkits to overthrow Gurkhan in turn, but their leader, Toqto'a Beki, refused despite the fact that Toghrul offered him his daughter because the Keraites were very numerous. Being unsuccessful, Toghrul went to see the father of Temüjin, Yesugei. He chose to help Toghrul because he had previously fought a battle with the Keraites against the Tatars. The Keraites were surprised when Yesugei attacked without having time to prepare. Despite the fact that the Keraites were much more numerous, their forces were dispersed throughout Central Mongolia. Toghrul resumed the command of the Keraites, and Gurkhan fled.

=== Relationship with Temüjin ===
Toghrul was blood-brother of Temüjin's father Yesükhei. He led the coalition against Merkits when Temüjin's wife Börte was abducted in 1183, joined by his brother Jakha Gambhu, Jamukha and Temüjin. Two of the tribal chiefs, Dair Usun and Toqto'a fled the camp, probably informed by people who had seen the army move. The coalition easily won the fight that followed and about 300 Merkit perished. The chiefs distributed the booty among themselves and gave the Merkit wives to the warriors. The children became slaves. Börte was found later in the evening. Toghrul returned to the Kerait camp with his men, proud of an easy victory.

Temüjin, intending to attack the Tatar Confederation who had long caused him problems, including the murder of his father, asked for help from Toghrul in 1194; he willingly accepted, still satisfied with the victory he had had before. Toghrul's grandfather Marcus Buyruk Khan had also been assassinated by the Tatar, which gave him a similar reason to fight them. He joined Temüjin with a few thousand Keraites. The Jurkhin, a Mongolic tribe, were also invited, but declined the offer because they were somewhat hostile with the Borjigin tribe. They eventually found allies in Wanyan Xiang (完顏襄), minister of Emperor Zhangzong of the Jurchen-led Jin dynasty of China. The Tatars were considered by the Jurchens to be harmful and the opportunity was perfect to exterminate them. When the combined forces of Toghrul and Genghis Khan attacked the Tatars, they were caught in a vice as the Jurchen warriors behind them easily encircled the enemy tribe. The men were slaughtered, the women were taken as concubines and the children were adopted or became servants and slaves. Some thousands of Tatar who had resisted and then escaped entrenched themselves. This was the time when he was given the name Wang Khan (Chinese: 王汗; lit. 'King Khan').

Later that year he was overthrown by Erke Qara, whom he had not been able to assassinate and returned with the Naiman army. Many Keraites who were dissatisfied with the command of Toghrul probably also helped to drive Toghrul out. He fled to Yelü Zhilugu without even going to seek the help of Temüjin. He stayed there a year according to the Secret History. It was after leaving the Qara-Khitai that he finally decided to join Genghis Khan. According to Rashid al-Din, he would have reached Genghis Khan's encampment by 1196. Toghrul became his guest for about two years.

== Second reign ==
Living in exile, Toghrul was aided by Temüjin, who undertook an attack to the Merkits for a second time and gave a large part of the booty to Toghrul, who gifted it to different Kerait chiefs to consolidate allies with his tribe of origin. Temüjin then allegedly attacked a Kerait clan, the Tumen Tubegen, and a large part of the survivors became Toghrul's followers. The Keraites returned fully to Toghrul around 1198. The Naimans remained neutral and offered no help to Erke Qara because the Naiman people were then divided between two kings. Buyruq khan took the southern part and Tayang khan inherited the northern part of the Naiman lands. Erke Qara fled for the second time, this time to Buyruq khan. To reward the Keraites who had remained faithful to him, Toghrul ordered them to plunder the weakened Merkits for the third time. Important Merkits, including two sons of Toqto'a-beki, were captured while another was murdered. Meanwhile, Toghrul's brother, Jakha Gambhu became blood brothers with Temüjin.

=== Relationship with Naimans ===
Around 1199, Toghrul wanted to finish once and for all with the Naimans and the dispute between the two kings of this tribe was a useful chance to attack. If he attacked one of the brothers, it was almost certain that the other would do nothing and he could destroy them one after the other without having to confront the two tribes together, which could have formed a formidable alliance. He succeeded in bringing together Temüjin and Jamukha, chief of the tribe of the Jadaran, and forced them to become allies again, for they had hitherto become enemies. They did so, but with a distrust of one another. When the forces of coalition came together to fight Buyruq's army, they quickly realized that the Naiman lands were conducive to a long pursuit. Indeed, Toghrul had a hard time chasing his enemies because they had plenty of ground to escape. After a hike of a few hundred kilometers, Toghrul realized that he could never catch them and came back. Buyruq's general Kökse Sabraq attacked Toghrul, who moved away from Temüjin, defeated Toghrul's son Senggüm, capturing his son and wife in process. However they were beaten back thanks to aid from Temüjin.

In 1200, Toghrul aided Temüjin, who was attacked by an alliance formed by the Taichiud, commanded by Targhutai Kiriltuk, an old enemy of Temüjin, and Merkit led by Toqto'a Beki, who had recently recovered his son on the banks of the Onon River.

=== Relationship with Jamukha ===
In 1201, Jamukha had resumed hostilities against Temüjin. An impressive coalition of Mongol tribes of Taichiud, Ikires, Qorolas, Salji'ut, Dörbet, Suldus, Qatagin, Besud, Merkit, Oirat and finally Tatars recognized Jamukha as "Khan Universal" (Gurkhan). Toghrul decided to back Temüjin in order to oppose growing power of Jamukha. Toghrul, Jakha Gambu and Temüjin went into the Kerulen Valley with 15000 men. When they saw the enemy, they climbed the mountains because they were shorthanded against the enemy. It was also when Buyruq khan joined Jamukha. Toghrul and Temüjin fought a defensive battle which was very difficult and perilous. Torrential rain made the rolling hills and mountains men fell from the top to finish in crevices and ravines. After the enemy had withdrawn his forces, Toghrul left to return to Tula river with his warriors. Temüjin took advantage of the flight of his enemies to finish several on horseback. Targhutai was reportedly wounded to death as a result of the fight.

Jamukha had fared badly during the first attack and Buyruq khan took command of the armies in 1202. Temüjin took the initiative to make a massacre among the Tatar, which dramatically reduced their numbers. Genghis and Toghrul returned to the mountains, but this time in the southern portion and faced the newly-commanding Kuchuguden's men, among them were Merkit, South Naiman, Oirats and tribes following Jamukha. Six tribes had left Jamukha and there were only four. Again, steep slopes, trees and various natural obstacles greatly slowed down the enemies of Toghrul and Temüjin and the fight gradually grew favorable.

== Death ==
Toghrul was more than 70 years old by 1203 and did not have the same reflexes as in his youth. His son Ilga Senggüm took command of the Kerait armies and Toghrul became a figurehead. Ambitious Ilga joined forces with Jamukha, Altan and Qutchar, who persuaded him to eliminate Temüjin. Ilga attempted to assassinate him, failed, and then confronted the hordes of Temüjin in a fierce battle in which he was wounded. Toghrul was present and assumed command, but he was more or less unable to fight himself given his advanced age and withdrew his men from the fight. Some of Keraites joined the forces with Temüjin during and after the battle. After this battle, the Battle of the Burning Sands, Temüjin received the help of the Qonggirats who had confronted him during the first battle of Kerulen and then fled to Jamukha. Toghrul and Ilga, however, were still more numerous. Temüjin sent ambassadors to demand peace, as he wished to renew his friendship with Toghrul. Ilga, now choosing for his father, rejected the request. Other tribes joined Temüjin during that year. He was then in possession of eleven tribes, which formed a third of the whole population of Mongolia. As the enemy increased in number, Jamukha, Qutchar and Altan conspired against Toghrul, but eventually left the Kerait to take refuge with the Naimans of the North. The Tayitchi'ut, Dorbed, Qatagin and Salji'ut followed them.

He died after Temüjin attacked the Keraites by surprise. 8,000 Mongol horsemen faced Keraites for three days but eventually Kerait surrendered. Toghrul fled to Tayang Khan but was killed by a Naiman soldier named Qori Sübeči who did not recognize him. The majority of the Keraites allied themselves with Temüjin. Toghrul's head was later noticed by Tayang, who was panicked and then stepped on it, crushing it.

== Family ==
He was married to a Khitan woman and had at least two sons – Ilga Senggüm and Uyku. According to Jami' al-Tawarikh, Doquz Khatun was a daughter of Uyku.

== Legacy ==
Starting from 15th century, Torghut nobles claimed descent from Toghrul.
