= Jamukha =

Mongol khan, rival of Temüjin

Jamukha (Mongolian: Жамуха), a military and political leader of the Jadaran tribe who was proclaimed Gur Khan ('Universal Ruler') in 1201 by opposing factions, was a principal rival to Temüjin (proclaimed Genghis Khan in 1206) during the struggle for supremacy over the diverse tribes of the Mongolian steppe, a conflict that ultimately led to their unification under Temüjin.

== Biography ==
Jamukha was born into the Jadaran tribe, a sub-tribe within the Khamag Mongol confederation. He was also an anda, a sworn brother, to Temüjin.

According to The Secret History of the Mongols, when Börte, wife of Temüjin, and Sochigel, his step-mother, were abducted by the Three Merkits, Wang Khan, Jamukha, and Temüjin combined forces against the Merkits to recover the women.

In 1201, the leaders of thirteen tribes hostile to Temüjin (including the Merkits, Tatars, Naimans, Jamukha's own Jadaran tribe, the Taichuud, and others not allied with Temüjin) assembled a kurultai. They elected Jamukha as Gur-khan (universal ruler), a title previously used by the rulers of the Kara-Khitan Khanate. Jamukha's assumption of this title represented the final breach between him and Temüjin, leading Temüjin to form a coalition to oppose him. In the fall of that year, a major battle broke out between Jamukha's alliance and the Keraite-Khamag Mongol alliance in the Ergune valley. This decisive engagement, known as the Battle of the Thirteen Sides, ended with Temüjin's victory, significantly advancing his path towards eventually becoming Khan of all united Mongol tribes (an event formalised in 1206).

Jamukha was ultimately less successful than Temüjin in building a broad and resilient coalition. For example, Jamukha tended to rely on traditional tribal aristocracy and did not actively recruit commoners or shepherds who lacked high tribal status. In contrast, Temüjin's willingness to promote based on merit and loyalty attracted a wider following, allowing him to recover from earlier military setbacks (some inflicted by Jamukha himself) and eventually emerge victorious.

Following the Thirteen Sides, Jamukha was betrayed and captured by his own men, who submitted him to the victorious Temüjin. Citing one of the laws Temüjin had established (often associated with the later Yassa code), which forbade the betrayal of one's Khan, Temüjin had Jamukha's betrayers immediately executed. Jamukha himself was subsequently interrogated. Offered the choice to live and join Temüjin, he requested instead to die honorably at the hands of his anda. Temüjin granted this request, and Jamukha was executed according to noble tradition, "without spilling blood".

== In popular culture ==
Jamukha is portrayed as a major character in the 1956 film The Conqueror, the 1965 film Genghis Khan (portrayed by Stephen Boyd), and the 2007 film Mongol (portrayed by Honglei Sun). In The Conqueror, the screenplay depicts him as unfailingly loyal and subordinate to Temujin, ending with Jamukha insisting on a bloodless execution after Temujin grants him a favor. This contrasts sharply with the 1965 Genghis Khan film, which depicts them as lifelong rivals who both perish in a climactic duel, a significant deviation from historical accounts.

He appears (as "Jamuga") in the KOEI video game Genghis Khan II as a playable ruler.

He is also a character in Shike, a two-volume novel published in 1981 by Robert Shea. The novel fictionalises and compresses Japanese history to incorporate both the Genpei War and the attempted Mongol invasions of Japan.

== Sources ==
- Heirs to Discord: The Supratribal Aspirations of Jamuqa, Toghrul, and Temüjin
- Weatherford, Jack. Genghis Khan and the Making of the Modern World. New York: Three Rivers, 2005. Print.
