= Naimans =

12th-century tribal confederation of the Mongolian Plateau

ᠨᠠᠶᠢᠮᠠᠨ
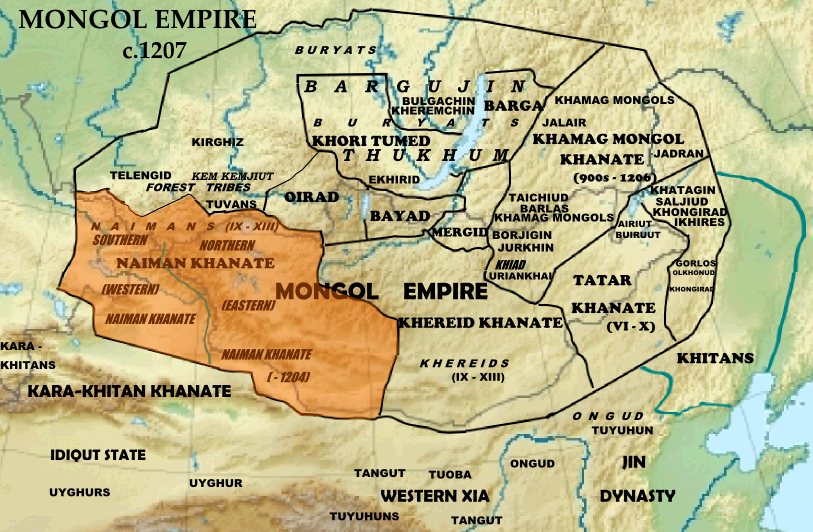
- Location of the Naiman khanate at the start of the Mongol Empire

Regions with significant populations
- Kazakhstan: 940.000
- China: Naiman Banner
- Mongolia

Languages
- Turkic, Mongolic

Religion
- Tibetan Buddhism (Mongolia); Islam (Kazakhstan, Uzbekistan, Kyrgyzstan); Shamanism; Nestorianism (Former)

The Naiman (/ˈnaɪmən/; Karakalpak: Nayman; Kazakh: Найман, نايمان [nɑjˈmɑn]; Kyrgyz: Найман; Mongolian: ᠨᠠᠶᠢᠮᠠᠨ [ˈnɛːmɴ̩]; Nogai: Найман; Uzbek: Nayman) were a medieval nation originating in the territory of modern Western Mongolia. They are thought to have emerged possibly during the period of the Uyghur Khaganate. The name derives from a word meaning "eight" in the relevant Turkic and Mongolic languages.

Their modern descendants are found among several Central Asian peoples.

== History ==
In The Secret History of the Mongols, the Naiman subtribe the "Güchügüd" are mentioned. According to Russian Turkologist Nikolai Aristov's view, the Naiman Khanate's western border reached the Irtysh River and its eastern border reached the Mongolian Tamir River. The Altai Mountains and southern Altai Republic were part of the Naiman Khanate. They had diplomatic relations with the Kara-Khitans, and were subservient to them until 1175. Western European and Asian scholars classified them as a Turkic people from Sekiz Oghuz (means "Eight Oghuz" in Turkic). Scholars like Paul Ratchnevsky, Wolfgang-Ekkehard Scharlipp, Hans Robert Roemer, Maria Czaplicka, Steven Runciman, John Man, Morris Rossabi, Frederick W. Mote, Li Tang, Joo-Yup Lee/Shuntu Kuang, Hans-Joachim Klimkeit, René Grousset classified them as Turkic people. UNESCO-published History of Civilizations of Central Asia classified them as Turkic people. In the Russian and Soviet historiography of Central Asia they were traditionally ranked among the Mongol-speaking tribes. For instance, such Russian orientalists as Vasily Bartold, Grigory Potanin, Boris Vladimirtsov, Ilya Petrushevsky, Nicholas Poppe, Lev Gumilyov, Vadim Trepavlov classified them as one of Mongol tribes. However, the term "Naiman" has Mongolian origin meaning "eight", but their titles are Turkic, and they are thought by some to be possibly Mongolized Turks. They have been described as Turkic-speaking, as well as Mongolian-speaking. Chinese historian Feng Chia-Sheng considered the Naimans to be the western branch of the Zubu; in his view, the eastern Zubu were the Jalairs and the Tatars, while the northern Zubu were the Keraites.

Like the Khitans and the Uyghurs, many of them were Nestorian Christians or Buddhists.

The Naimans were located to the west of the Mongols, and there were more Naimans than Mongols in the late 12th century. In 1199, Temüjin (Genghis Khan) together with an ally Ong khan launched a campaign against the Naimans. They defeated Buyirugh, a Naiman khan who ruled the mountain lineage. In 1203, the last Tayang khan, the ruler of Naimans of the steppe, was killed after a battle with Genghis Khan. His son Kuchlug with his remaining Naiman troops then fled to the Kara-Khitan Khanate. Kuchlug was well received there and the Khitan Khan gave him his daughter in marriage. Kuchlug soon began plotting against his new father-in-law, and after he usurped the throne, he began to persecute Muslims in the Hami Oases. But his action was opposed by local people and he was later defeated by the Mongols under Jebe.

Although the Naiman Khanlig was crushed by the Mongols, they were seen in every part of the Mongol Empire. Ogedei's great khatun ("queen") Töregene might have been from this tribe. Hulegu had a Naiman general, Ketbuqa, who died in the Battle of Ain Jalut in 1260.

After the collapse of the Yuan dynasty, the Naiman were eventually assimilated into Mongol, Tatar, and Kazakh tribes.

== Among Mongols ==
Territories of the Naiman subgroup of Mongols in the Qing Empire, 1911

The modern Naiman tribe is an ethnic group in Naiman Banner, Inner Mongolia of China. The clan Naiman changed the clan name and mixed with other tribes in Mongolia.

== Among Turkic peoples ==
Karakalpak

Naimans are one tribal groups of Karakalpaks.

=== Kazakhs ===
Modern Kazakh historians claim that more than 2 million of the Kazakh population are Naimans (see Modern Kazakh tribes or Middle Juz). They originate from eastern Kazakhstan. Some Naimans dissimilated with the Kyrgyz and Uzbek ethnicities and are still found among them. Now, the Naimans are one of the big tribes of modern Kazakh peoples, they belong to Middle Juz of Kazakhs, live mainly in the eastern, central and southern parts of Kazakhstan, with a population of approximately one million among Kazakhs in Kazakhstan.

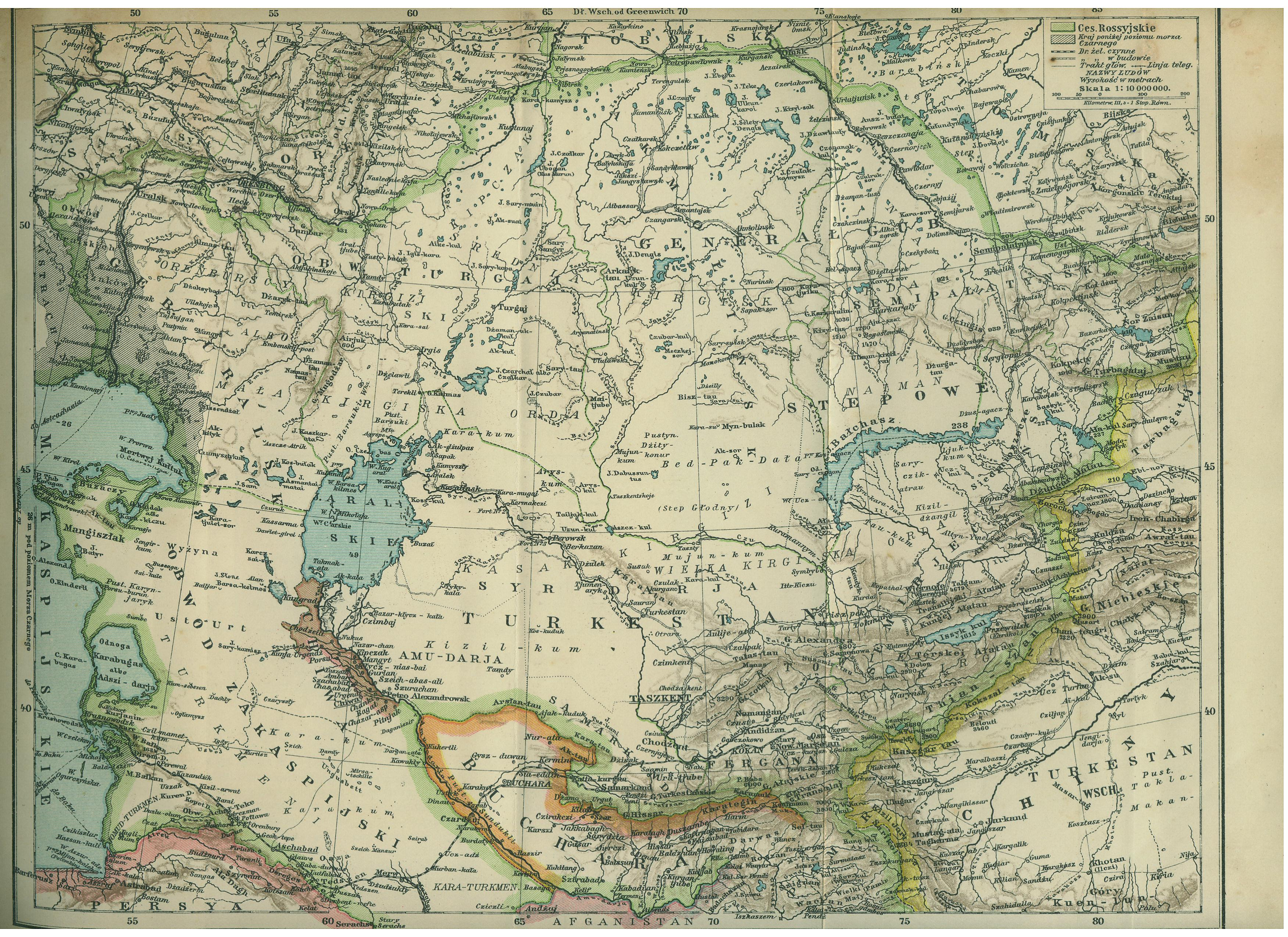
Map from a 1903 Polish encyclopedia showing the Naiman people living north of Lake Balkhash in eastern Kazakhstan

They also exist with considerable population among the Kazakhs in China, Uzbekistan and Russia, the Naiman tribe populations in the Kazakhs in China is 700000 or more, mostly living in the western part of Xinjiang Uighur Autonomous Region of China, in the Ili Kazakh Autonomous Prefecture. Naimans are also one of the major tribe among Kazakhs in the Uzbekistan, they also exist among Kazakhs in Kyrgyzstan and Russia.

==== Genetics ====
The two most common haplogroups among the Naimans of Kazakhstan are O2a2b1-M134 (42%) and C2-M217 (37%) . At the clan level, haplogroup O2a2b1-M134 is more characteristic of the Tolegetai clan (70%), while haplogroup C2b1a2-M48 is more common among the Saryzhomart clan (61%).

Genetically, the Kazakhs of Kazakhstan are most closely related to the Uzumchins, who live in Inner Mongolia and eastern Mongolia.

According to genetic studies, the Naimans of Kazakhstan most likely descend in the direct paternal line from ancestors bearing haplogroup O, which is typically associated with East Asian populations.

The Naimans, along with such tribal groups as the Uisun, Zhalayir, Kerey, Konyrat, Alimuly, Bayuly, Zhetiru, and Tore, are included in a cluster that finds genetic proximity with the populations of Buryat Ekhirit-Bulagatsky District, various groups of Mongols, Karakalpaks, Khamnigans, Hazaras, and Evenks populations.

Kyrgyz

Naimans are part of Ichkilik (also known as Bulgachilar) one three largest tribal associations of Kyrgyzs.

Nogais

Naimans are part of Nogai tribes.

Hazaras

There is a tribe of Sheikh Ali Hazaras who are of Naiman origin. In Afghanistan they mainly reside in the Sheikh Ali District of the Parwan Province.

Uzbeks

The Naimans are part of 92 tribes of Uzbeks.

== Religion ==
The main religion of the Naimans was shamanism and Nestorian Christianity. The Naimans that adopted Nestorianism probably converted around the same time the Keraites adopted the religion in the 11th century. They remained so after the Mongol conquest and were among the second wave of Christians to enter China with Kublai Khan. Some Nestorian Naiman fled to Kara Khitai during the Mongol conquests where some converted to Buddhism.

There was a tradition that the Naimans and their Christian relatives, the Keraites, descended from the Biblical Magi. The commander of the Mongol army that invaded Syria in 1259, Kitbuqa, was a Naiman: he is recorded to have "loved and honoured the Christians, because he was of the lineage of the Three Kings of Orient who came to Bethlehem to adore the nativity of Our Lord". However, Kitbuqa was slain and his army decisively defeated at the Battle of Ain Jalut, ensuring continued Muslim hegemony over the Levant.

Nestorianism declined and vanished among the Naiman soon after the collapse of the Yuan dynasty. Mongolian Naimans converted to Tibetan Buddhism in the sixteenth century. The Naiman assimilated into other ethnic groups living in Eurasia and likely adopted the religion and culture of the dominant group. The Naimans who settled in the western khanates of the Mongol Empire all eventually converted to Islam.

== See also ==
- List of medieval Mongol tribes and clans
- Southern Mongolian dialect
