= Timeline of Mongols prior to the Mongol Empire =

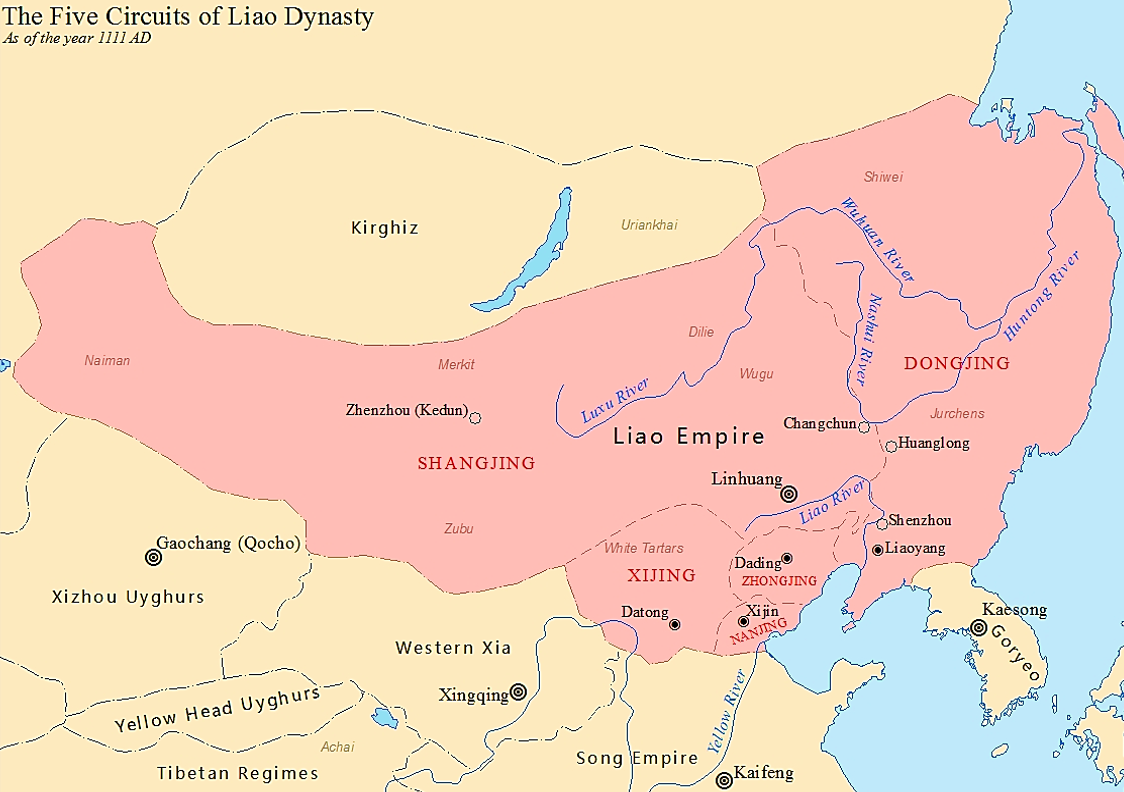
The Zubu and Shiwei in relation to the Khitans.

This is a timeline of Mongols prior to the Mongol Empire.

== 8th century ==
=== 700s ===
Year	Date	Event
700		Chinese records mention a tribe called "Mengwu", probably pronounced "Mung-nguet" at the time, inhabiting Manchuria

== 10th century ==
=== 900s ===
Year	Date	Event
908		Abaoji attacks the Shiwei

=== 920s ===
Year	Date	Event
928		Khongirad rebels against the Liao dynasty in the north

=== 950s ===
Year	Date	Event
950		Chinese records mention a "Mengwu" tribe living in the grasslands west of the Greater Khingan and southeast of Lake Baikal

=== 960s ===
Year	Date	Event
965		Khongirad and Shiwei tribes rebel against the Liao dynasty

=== 990s ===
Year	Date	Event
997		Zubu Poosy rebel against the Liao dynasty

== 11th century ==
=== 1000s ===
Year	Date	Event
1007		Zubu tribes rebel against the Liao dynasty

=== 1050s ===
Year	Date	Event
1050		Khaidu, "the first to rule all the Mongols", is born

=== 1060s ===
Year	Date	Event
1069		Zubu tribes rebel against the Liao dynasty

=== 1080s ===
Year	Date	Event
1084		"Mengwu" visit the Liao dynasty court

== 12th century ==
=== 1100s ===
Year	Date	Event
1100		Khaidu dies

=== 1110s ===
Year	Date	Event
1118		Zubu tribes rebel against the Liao dynasty

=== 1140s ===
Year	Date	Event
1146		Khabul Khan of the Khamag Mongols, great-grandson of Khaidu, rebels against the Jin dynasty

=== 1160s ===
Year	Date	Event
1160		Conflict with the Jin dynasty reduces the Mongol tribes and the Borjigin clan to destitution
1162		Temüjin is born in Delüün Boldog near Burkhan Khaldun to the Mongol chieftain Yesugei and Hoelun

== Genghis Khan's ancestors ==
Borte Chino (Grey Wolf) and his wife was Gua Maral (White Doe)

- 1. Bat Tsagan - was the son of Borte Chino and Gua Maral
  - 2. Tamacha - was the son of Bat Tsagan
    - 3. Horichar Mergen - was the son of Tamacha
      - 4. Uujim Buural - was the son of Horichar Mergen
        - 5. Sali Hachau - was the son of Uujim Buural
          - 6. Yehe Nidun - was the son of Sali Hachau
            - 7. Sem Sochi - was the son of Yehe Nidun
              - 8. Harchu - was the son of Sem Sochi
                - 9. Borjigidai Mergen - was the son of Harchu, and his wife was Mongoljin Gua
                  - 10. Torogoljin Bayan - was the son of Borjigidai Mergen, and his wife was Borogchin Gua
                    - 11. Duva Sokhor - was the first son of Torogoljin Bayan
                    - 11. Dobu Mergen|Dobun Mergen - was the second son of Torogoljin Bayan, and his wife was Alan Gua
                      - 12. Belgunudei - was the first son of Dobun Mergen and Alan Gua
                      - 12. Bugunudei - was the second son of Dobun Mergen and Alan Gua

---

- 12. Bukhu Khatagi - was the first son of Alan Gua, conceived after the death of Dobun Mergen
- 12. Bukhatu Salji - was the second son of Alan Gua, conceived after the death of Dobun Mergen
- 12. Bodonchar Munkhag - was the third son of Alan Gua, conceived after the death of Dobun Mergen
  - 13. Habich Baghatur - was the son of Bodonchar Munkhag
    - 14. Menen Tudun - was the son of Habich Baghatur
      - 15. Hachi Hulug - was the son of Menen Tudun
        - 16. Khaidu - was the son of Hachi Hulug
          - 17. Bashinkhor Dogshin - was the first son of Khaidu
            - 18. Tumbinai Setsen - was the son of Baishinkhor Dogshin
              - 19. Khabul Khan - was the first son of Tumbinai Setsen, and Khan of the Khamag Mongol (1120–1149)
                - 20. Ohinbarhag - was the first son of Khabul Khan
                - 20. Bartan Baghatur - was the second son of Khabul Khan
                  - 21. Mengitu Hiyan - was the first son of Bartan Baghatur
                  - 21. Negun Taiji - was the second son of Bartan Baghatur
                  - 21. Yesugei - was the third son of Bartan Baghatur, and his wife was Hoelun
                    - 22. Temujin (Genghis Khan) - was the first son of Yesugei and Hoelun, and Khan of the Khamag Mongol (1189–1206)

== Bibliography ==
- Andrade, Tonio (2016), The Gunpowder Age: China, Military Innovation, and the Rise of the West in World History, Princeton University Press, ISBN 978-0-691-13597-7.
- Asimov, M.S. (1998), History of civilizations of Central Asia Volume IV The age of achievement: A.D. 750 to the end of the fifteenth century Part One The historical, social and economic setting, UNESCO Publishing
- Barfield, Thomas (1989), The Perilous Frontier: Nomadic Empires and China, Basil Blackwell
- Barrett, Timothy Hugh (2008), The Woman Who Discovered Printing, Great Britain: Yale University Press, ISBN 978-0-300-12728-7 (alk. paper)
- Beckwith, Christopher I. (2009), Empires of the Silk Road: A History of Central Eurasia from the Bronze Age to the Present, Princeton University Press, ISBN 978-0-691-13589-2
- Beckwith, Christopher I (1987), The Tibetan Empire in Central Asia: A History of the Struggle for Great Power among Tibetans, Turks, Arabs, and Chinese during the Early Middle Ages, Princeton University Press
- Biran, Michal (2005), The Empire of the Qara Khitai in Eurasian History: Between China and the Islamic World, Cambridge Studies in Islamic Civilization, Cambridge, England: Cambridge University Press, ISBN 0521842263
- Bregel, Yuri (2003), An Historical Atlas of Central Asia, Brill
- Drompp, Michael Robert (2005), Tang China And The Collapse Of The Uighur Empire: A Documentary History, Brill
- Ebrey, Patricia Buckley (1999), The Cambridge Illustrated History of China, Cambridge: Cambridge University Press, ISBN 0-521-66991-X (paperback).
- Ebrey, Patricia Buckley; Walthall, Anne; Palais, James B. (2006), East Asia: A Cultural, Social, and Political History, Boston: Houghton Mifflin, ISBN 0-618-13384-4
- Golden, Peter B. (1992), An Introduction to the History of the Turkic Peoples: Ethnogenesis and State-Formation in Medieval and Early Modern Eurasia and the Middle East, Wiesbaden: Otto Harrassowitz, ISBN 3-447-03274-X
- Graff, David A. (2002), Medieval Chinese Warfare, 300-900, Warfare and History, London: Routledge, ISBN 0415239559
- Graff, David Andrew (2016), The Eurasian Way of War Military Practice in Seventh-Century China and Byzantium, Routledge, ISBN 978-0-415-46034-7.
- Haywood, John (1998), Historical Atlas of the Medieval World, AD 600-1492, Barnes & Noble
- Latourette, Kenneth Scott (1964), The Chinese, their history and culture, Volumes 1-2, Macmillan
- Lorge, Peter A. (2008), The Asian Military Revolution: from Gunpowder to the Bomb, Cambridge University Press, ISBN 978-0-521-60954-8
- Luttwak, Edward N. (2009), The Grand Strategy of the Byzantine Empire, The Belknap Press of Harvard University Press
- Millward, James (2009), Eurasian Crossroads: A History of Xinjiang, Columbia University Press, ISBN 978-0231125970
- Mote, F. W. (2003), Imperial China: 900–1800, Harvard University Press, ISBN 978-0674012127
- Needham, Joseph (1986), Science & Civilisation in China, vol. V:7: The Gunpowder Epic, Cambridge University Press, ISBN 0-521-30358-3
- Rong, Xinjiang (2013), Eighteen Lectures on Dunhuang, Brill
- Schafer, Edward H. (1985), The Golden Peaches of Samarkand: A study of T'ang Exotics, University of California Press
- Shaban, M. A. (1979), The ʿAbbāsid Revolution, Cambridge: Cambridge University Press, ISBN 0-521-29534-3
- Sima, Guang (2015), Bóyángbǎn Zīzhìtōngjiàn 54 huánghòu shīzōng 柏楊版資治通鑑54皇后失蹤, Yuǎnliú chūbǎnshìyè gǔfèn yǒuxiàn gōngsī, ISBN 978-957-32-0876-1
- Skaff, Jonathan Karam (2012), Sui-Tang China and Its Turko-Mongol Neighbors: Culture, Power, and Connections, 580-800 (Oxford Studies in Early Empires), Oxford University Press, ISBN 978-0190886974
- Standen, Naomi (2007), Unbounded Loyalty Frontier Crossings in Liao China, University of Hawai'i Press
- Steinhardt, Nancy Shatzman (1997), Liao Architecture, University of Hawaii Press
- Twitchett, Denis C. (1979), The Cambridge History of China, Vol. 3, Sui and T'ang China, 589–906, Cambridge University Press
- Twitchett, Denis (1994), The Cambridge History of China, Volume 6, Alien Regime and Border States, 907-1368, Cambridge: Cambridge University Press, ISBN 0521243319
- Twitchett, Denis (2009), The Cambridge History of China Volume 5 The Sung dynasty and its Predecessors, 907-1279, Cambridge University Press
- Wang, Zhenping (2013), Tang China in Multi-Polar Asia: A History of Diplomacy and War, University of Hawaii Press
- Wilkinson, Endymion (2015). Chinese History: A New Manual, 4th edition. Cambridge, MA: Harvard University Asia Center distributed by Harvard University Press. ISBN 9780674088467.
- Xiong, Victor Cunrui (2000), Sui-Tang Chang'an: A Study in the Urban History of Late Medieval China (Michigan Monographs in Chinese Studies), U OF M CENTER FOR CHINESE STUDIES, ISBN 0892641371
- Xiong, Victor Cunrui (2009), Historical Dictionary of Medieval China, United States of America: Scarecrow Press, Inc., ISBN 978-0810860537
- Xu, Elina-Qian (2005), HISTORICAL DEVELOPMENT OF THE PRE-DYNASTIC KHITAN, Institute for Asian and African Studies 7
- Xue, Zongzheng (1992), Turkic peoples, 中国社会科学出版社
- Yuan, Shu (2001), Bóyángbǎn Tōngjiàn jìshìběnmò 28 dìèrcìhuànguánshídài 柏楊版通鑑記事本末28第二次宦官時代, Yuǎnliú chūbǎnshìyè gǔfèn yǒuxiàn gōngsī, ISBN 957-32-4273-7
- Yule, Henry (1915), Cathay and the Way Thither: Being a Collection of Medieval Notices of China, Vol I: Preliminary Essay on the Intercourse Between China and the Western Nations Previous to the Discovery of the Cape Route, Hakluyt Society
