= Habich Baghatur =

10th century Khan of The Borjigid

Habich Baatar
- Khan of the Borjigin

2nd Khan of the Borjigin
- Predecessor: Bodonchar Munkhag
- Successor: Menen Tudun
- Born: between Early to Mid 10th Centuries AD. Mongolia
- Died: 10th Century; Mongolia
- Issue: Menen Tudun
Era dates
- (10th–Centuries)
- House: Borjigin
- Father: Bodonchar Khan
- Religion: Tengrism

Habich Baatar, Habich Khan or Habich Baatar Khan (Mongol: Хабич Баатар, living around 10th–Centuries AD.) was a ruler of the Mongol Borjigin. He was the son and successor of his father Bodonchar Khan, one of his descendants was his great-great-great-great-grandson khabul Khan founded the Khamag Mongol confederation. Habich Khan was the ancestral proginator of Genghis Khan (r. 1206 – 1227) the founder of the Mongol empire and also Amir Timur of the Barlas clan (r. 1370 – 1405) the founder of Timurid empire.

== Family ==
He was the son and successor of Bodonchar Khan, and great-great-grandfather of Khaidu Khan. His son Menen Tudun Khan succeeded him. He was the ancestor of Mongol Empire founder Genghis Khan (from the Kiyat branch of Borjigin). Genghis built his empire and spread it across Asia and large parts of Europe.

Habich was an ancestor of the founder of the Timurid Empire, Amir Timur, who was from the Barlas branch of the Borjigin. Timur's empire extended to the largest part of the Asian continent including Central Asia, Northern Asia, East Asia, South Asia and Western Asia.

Habich was the ancestor of Tumbinai Khan, the common ancestor of Genghis Khan and Timur.
