= Tumbinai Khan =

11th- and 12th–century Mongol ruler

- Khan of the Kiyat Borjigin

Khan of the Kiyat Borjigin
- Reign: ? – c. 1130 CE
- Predecessor: Bashinkhor Dogshin
- Successor: Khabul Khan
- Born: Tumbinai Setsen ? Mongolian Plateau
- Died: c. 1130; Mongolian Plateau
- Issue: Khabul Khan; Khaduli Barlas seven others
Names
- Tumbinai Setsen Khan
Era dates
- (11th & 12th century)
- House: Borjigin
- Father: Bashinkhor Dogshin
- Religion: Tengrism

Tumbinai Khan, Tumbinai Setsen Khan, or, among the Timurids, Tumanay Khan (Mongol: Тумбинай хаан, Тумбинай сэцэн, Туманай хаан; died c. 1130 C.E.) was the Khan of the Borjigin tribe. After his death, his son and successor Khabul Khan founded the Khamag Mongol, aided by his second son Khaduli. He was the son and successor of Baishinkhur Dogshin, who was the son of Kaidu Khan. Tumbinai was the ancestor of two great lineages: firstly through his son Khabul's great-grandson Genghis Khan, who was the founder of the Mongol Empire, one of the largest empires in the world, and secondly through his son Khaduli's grandson Qarachar Barlas, the founder of the Barlas Confederation, whose great-great-great-grandson Timur Barlas was the conqueror and founder of the Timurid Empire, and through Timur's great-great-great-grandson Babur, who was the founder of the Mughal Empire.

== Life ==
Tumbinai was born in the late 11th century, at a time when Mongol influence was rapidly growing. The Liao dynasty of China was a threat to the Mongols, so he paid tribute to the emperor. After his death, his eldest son Khabul Khan succeeded him and united the Mongol tribes, forming a Khamag Mongol Confederacy and becoming the first Khan of Mongol. Khabul fought and defeated Liao's forces. He was the great-great-great-great-grandson of Bodonchar Munkhag, who made the foundation of the Borjigin clan and lived in the 10th century.

== Descendants ==
Tumbinai was a great-great-grandfather of Genghis Khan, founder of the Mongol empire, through his eldest son Khabul Khan and the great-great-great-great-great-great-grandfather of Amir Timur, who was the founder of the Timurid empire at Central Asia, through his second son Khaduli and then his great-grandson Qarachar Barlas, who created the Barlas confederacy clan.
