= Hotula Khan =

Hotula Khan ᠬᠤᠲᠤᠯ ᠬᠠᠨ
- Khan of Khamag Mongol confederation

3rd Khan of the Khamag Mongol
- Reign: 1156 – 1161
- Predecessor: Ambaghai
- Successor: Yesugei
- Born: c. 1111; Mongolian Plateau
- Died: c. 1161 (aged 49–50); Mongolian Plateau
- Issue: Atlan; Girmau; Jochi
Era dates
- 12th Century
- House: Borjigin
- Father: Khabul Khan
- Religion: Tengrism

Hotula Khan or Qutula Khan (Traditional Mongolian:ᠬᠤᠲᠤᠯ
ᠬᠠᠨ; Chinese: 忽都剌罕;) (c. 1111 – 1161) was a Khan of Khamag Mongol, a son of Khabul Khan, and thus a great-uncle of Genghis Khan, and the nephew of Khaduli Barlas who was the ancestor of the Barlas Mongol clan, where Central Asian conqueror Timur originated and founded the Timurid Empire.

== Life ==
Most of his life is described in The Secret History of the Mongols and Jami' al-tawarikh. The fifth son of his father, he was described as brave and a courageous ruler. He pursued alliance with the Keraits, namely Toghrul against Tatars and Jin Dynasty. He pillaged the Tatars in retaliation of Ambaghai and his own brother, Ökin Barkak's kidnapping and execution, along with his nephews Qadaan Taishi and Yesugei. Despite the fact that the Mongols thirteen times clashed with the Tatar leaders Qoton Baraq and Jali Buqa, they did not manage to achieve a decisive advantage. He was ambushed after returning from his raid by Dörben tribe and was assumed dead by Yesugei and his kinsmen. He later died fighting the Tatars, who were aided by Jin Dynasty in 1161.

== Legacy ==
No Mongol emerged as khan after him until Genghis Khan. His nephew Yesugei only supervised the Khamag Mongols until his death in 1171. He had three sons - Jochi, Girmau and Altan. According to The Secret History of the Mongols, Altan denied requests for succeeding his father and submitted to Genghis Khan.

Hotula Khan House of Borjigin
Regnal titles
Preceded by Ambaghai	Khan of the Khamag Mongol; 1156–1161	Succeeded by Yesugei (de facto)
