= Bashinkhor Dogshin =

12th-century Mongol Borjigid ruler

Bashinkhor Khan ᠪᠠᠢᠱᠣᠩᠬᠣᠷ ᠳᠣᠭᠰᠢᠨ
- Khan of the Kiyat Borjigin

Khan of the Kiyat Borjigin
- Reign: c. 1100 – ?
- Predecessor: Khaidu Khan
- Successor: Tumbinai Setsen
- Born: 11th century AD; Mongolia
- Died: ? Mongolia
- Issue: Tumbinai Setsen
- Bashinkhur Dogshin Khan
Era dates
- (12th century)
- House: Kiyat Borjigin
- Father: Khaidu Khan
- Religion: Tengrism

Bashinkhor Dogshin, Bashinkur Khan, Bashinkhur Dogshin Khan, also known as Bashinkur (Mongol: Башинхор Догшин) (born 11th century AD) was a Mongol Kiyat Borjigin Ruler. He was the son and successor of Khaidu Khan. Bashinkhor was a great-great-great-grandson of Bodonchar Munkhag, who was a Mongol warlord and a founder of the Borjigin clan. Bashinkhor was a grandfather of Khabul Khan, who created the united Khamag Mongol Confederation. Upon his death, Bashinkor was immediately succeeded by his son, Tumbinai Setsen.
