= Ambaghai =

Khan of Khamag Mongol from 1148 to 1156

- Khan of the Khamag Mongol confederation

2nd Khan of the Khamag Mongol
- Reign: 1148 – 1156 AD
- Predecessor: Khabul Khan
- Successor: Hotula Khan

Chief of the Taichuud
- Reign: 1148 – 1156 CE
- Predecessor: Charaqai Lingqum
- Successor: Qadaan Taishi
- Born: Mongolia
- Died: c. 1156; Huining Prefecture, Jin dynasty
- Wife: Orbei; Sokhatai
- Issue: Adal Khan and eight others
Era dates
- 12th Century
- House: Taichiud
- Father: Senggün Bilge
- Religion: Tengrism
- Occupation: Ruler

Ambaghai (Mongolian: ᠠᠮᠪᠠᠭᠠᠢ) or Hambaqai Khan (? – died 1156) was a Khan of the Khamag Mongol, succeeding his cousin Khabul Khan. He was one of the great-grandsons of Khaidu Khan and the cousin and predecessor of Hotula Khan. He was the Leader of the Taichud clan, one of the sub-branches of the Borjigid, and also grandson and successor of Charaqai Lingqum.

== Life ==
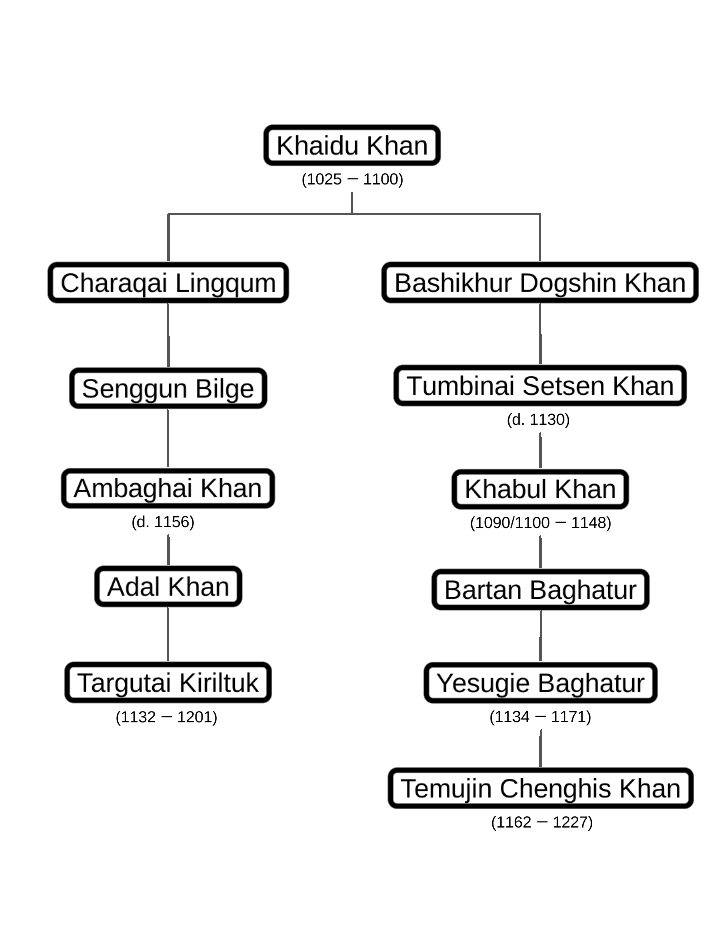
Genealogican chart.

Ambaghai was born to Sorqaduqtu China, a son of Charaqai Lingqum who in turn was son of Khaidu Khan. His father is mentioned as Senggüm Bilge in The Secret History of the Mongols. A member of the cadet branch of Borjigin clan, he was ruler of the Taichuud tribe and later khan of Khamag Mongol. According to Rashidaddin, Ambaghai succeeded Khabul Khan, because he was senior most in the Borjigid line. Toward the end of his rule, he was captured alongside Khabul Khan's son Tödö'en Otchigin by the Tatars when he was on a trip to marry his son Qadaan Taishi to a daughter of the chief of the Airu'ut Tatars. In fact, this was done under the commands of the Jurchen Jin dynasty in response to the Mongols' growing power. He was brought to the Jin capital Zhongdu, crucified, and then hacked to death. Sources do not give exact dates of Ambaghai's reign or his death date. According to Chih-Shu Eva Cheng's calculation, he died c. 1156 at the same time as Marcus, khan of the Naimans and father of Cyriacus. While Christoph Baumer states he reigned through 1146–1156. He was followed by Hotula Khan, his distant cousin.

His son Qadaan Taishi followed him as de facto chief of Taichuud and joined Hotula Khan on his campaigns against Tatars. But he was poisoned in 1160s, possibly by his brothers and cousins over succession. Qadaan seems to be succeeded by Targutai Kiriltuk - a subsequent rival of Genghis Khan.

In 1211 Genghis Khan instigated the Mongol–Jin War, ending in the fall of the Jin dynasty, in sworn revenge for Ambaghai's kidnapping and execution.

Ambaghai left several sons with his two wives - Orbei and Sokhatai:

1. Adal Khan
  1. Targutai Kiriltuk (d. 1201) — chief of Taichuuds and a rival of Genghis Khan.
2. Au'chu Baghatur
3. Qadaan Taishi
4. Quril Baghatur
5. Töda'a — one of the sub-chiefs of Taichuuds during reign of Genghis Khan.
6. Qodun Orchang
7. Bakhachi
8. Udor Bayan

== See also ==
- Family tree of Genghis Khan

Ambaghai House of Borjigin
Regnal titles
Preceded by Khabul Khan	Khan of the Khamag Mongol; 1146-1156	Succeeded by Hotula
