= Birlas (disambiguation) =

The Birlas are some of the foremost businesses in India.

Birlas may also refer to:

- Birlas (confederation), a Turko-Mongol nomadic confederation in Central Asia
