= Taichiud =

Mongol Clan from Borjigin Branch

House of Taichiuds Тайчиудын ордон
- Parent family: Kiyat Borjigin
- Country: Khamag Mongol; Mongol Empire; Ilkhanate; Chagatai Khanate; Timurid Empire
- Current region: East Asia; China; Central Asia; Western Asia
- Origin: Khamag Mongol
- Founded: Between Early-12th Centuries to c. 1148
- Founder: both Chirhya Lynhua Ambaghai Khan
- Final ruler: Sultan Husayn Tayichiud
- Titles: Khan; Noyan; Beg; Sultan
- Traditions: Tengrism later Sunni Islam
- Dissolution: c. 1405

The Taichuud (/ˈtaɪtʃuːd/; Mongolian: Тайчууд [ˈtʰæːtɕʰuːt]) was a Mongol subclan of the Kiyat Borjigin and one of the three core tribes of the Khamag Mongol confederation in the Mongolian Plateau during the 12th century. The clan's first recorded appearance was under Ambaghai Khan in 1148 AD, however it was founded by Ambaghai's grandfather Chirhya Lynhua, who was the son of Khaidu Khan, the founder of the Kiyat Clan. The clan finally ended with Sultan Husayn Tayichud in 1405 AD.

== Tribal arrangements ==
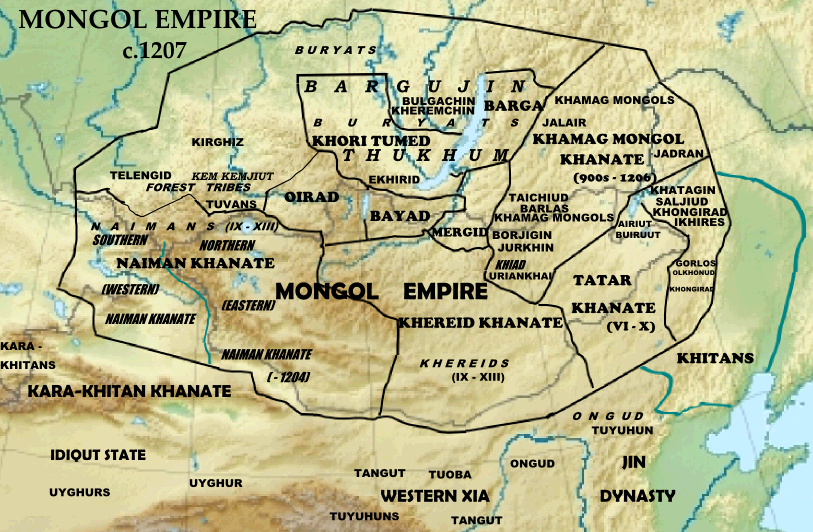
Mongol Empire c.1207, Tayichiud and their neighbors

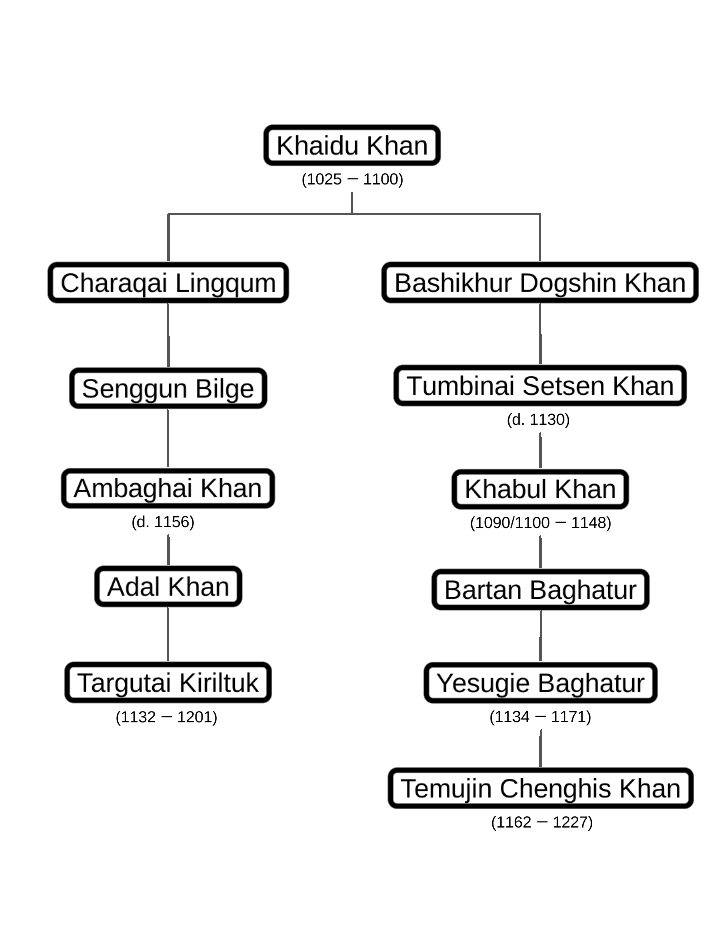
Tayichud and Chenghisid geneologican charts.

They lived in the southern part of current Zabaykalsky Krai and the Mongolian Dornod Province. Though the Khiyad Borjigids and the Tayichiuds were closely related and shared a common ancestor in Bodonchar Munkhag, at times they were arch-rivals for the rule of the Khamag Mongol. Though Khabul Khan of the Borjigin had 7 sons, he had designated Ambaghai, a son of Sengum Bilge of the Tayichiud, as his successor. Thus Ambaghai Khan became the second khan of the Khamag Mongol. The rule of the Mongols had alternated between the Borjigid and the Tayichiud tribes, finally coming into the hands of Genghis Khan of Borjigid.

== Role ==
The Tayichiud were rivals of the Naimans and several other tribes. In the Secret History of the Mongols, they were portrayed as bitter enemies of Genghis Khan. As allies of Jamukha and the Keraites, they would defeat the latter bitterly.

== Fall and descendants ==
Although the ruling Tayichiud clan was destroyed by Genghis, their descendants, who had surrendered, achieved fame in parts of the Mongol Empire. Jebe (born Jurgaadai), who had struck the final blow to the Jurchens during the Mongol conquest of the Jin dynasty in 1219 and defeated the Kypchaks and their European allies at the battle of Kalka in 1223, was from Besud clan of Tayichiud. Baiju, the commander of the Tammachi in Persia, was also from the Besud clan of the Tayichiud. Chilaun, one of Genghis Khan's four close companions, was from the Suldus, a sub-clan of the Tayichiud. His descendant Chupan reached the peak of his career during the reign of Ilkhan Abu Said, and was given the title of chief commander of all Mongol Khanates by the court of the Yuan Dynasty in 1327. In the Chagatai Khanate, another aristocrat, Buyan Suldus, overthrew the Qara'unas in Transoxiana in 1359, but was executed by Chagatai Khan Tughluq Temur in 1362.

== Influence ==
The tribe exerted great influence during the reign of Timur. The head of the Tayichiud during this time was Amir Musa. Though clashing with Timur on several occasions, Amir Musa also enjoyed multiple matrimonial alliances with the imperial family. Both his daughter, Tuman Agha, and niece, Saray Mulk Khanum, were married to the emperor, with the latter becoming his chief consort. In addition to this, Amir Musa's son Muhammad Beg was married to Timur's daughter Aka Begim. They were the parents of Sultan Husayn Tayichiud. Sultan Husayn, later held prominent positions in the imperial army.

== Present day ==
People with the clan name Taichiud or Taijiud, Taijuud are found in present-day Mongolia, Inner Mongolia and in Kalmykia (tyayachiud).
