= Bolor Erike =

The Bolor Erike (The Crystal Beads; Middle Mongolian: ᠪᠣᠯᠤᠷ
ᠡᠷᠢᠬᠡ Bolor erikhe, Modern Mongolian: Болор эрих Bolor erikh) is a Mongolian chronicle written by Rashpuntsag in 1776. "Information Mongolia" calls the Bolor Erikh an important moment in Mongolian historiography. This history is said to have “made a successful attempt at critical assessment of the sources and appraisal of various historical events. Moreover, Rashpuntsag substantiated in his own way imperative need for criticism and dispute in recording history". Rashpunstag suggested that Xiongnu were a Mongolic people. American Mongolist Dr.Christopher Atwood of Indiana University, noted that Rashpuntsag "was the first Mongolian historian to be significantly influenced by Chinese historical writing and make use Chinese historical data (1998:330).

== Edition ==
- Rasipungsuy: Bolor Erike: Mongolian chronicle. Five volumes. With a critical introduction by Antoine Mostaert and an editor's foreword by Francis Woodman Cleaves. Harvard-Yenching Institute. Scripta Mongolica, 3. Harvard University Press, Cambridge 1959

== See also ==
- Erdeni Tobchi
