= Rashipungsug =

Mongolian writer (fl. 1774)

- Born: Rashipungsug; First half of the 18th century
- Died: After 1774
- Occupations: Historian, writer
- Writing career
- Notable work: Bolor erike

Rashipungsug (Mongolian: Раашпунцаг, fl. 1774) was a Mongol writer active during the Qing dynasty. He is best remembered for his history Bolor erike ("Crystal Rosary"), completed in 1774. He was the first Mongolian historian to be influenced by Chinese historical writing, and the first to notice and challenge the anti-Mongolian and anti-Buddhist attitudes that were prevalent in Chinese sources at the time.

== Biography ==
He was a Mongol nobleman from the west-wing Baarin banner.

In 1774 he completed his Bolor erike ("Crystal Rosary" or "Crystal Garland"), a history produced under the Qing dynasty. In this work, among other things, he asserts that the Mongols are a unified unity, and that they "should be inherently part of the Qing," offers a significant interpretation of the word Mongol, and addresses the origin of the Mongols. Though he followed the basic structure of the Mongolian tradition of chronicle-writing, he was "significantly influenced" by Chinese historical writing. He was the first Mongolian historian who noticed and challenged the "anti-Mongol and anti-Buddhist attitudes typical of Chinese sources."
