= Baarins =

Eastern Mongol subgroup

Territories of the Baarin Mongols, 1911

The Baarin (Mongolian: ᠠᠪᠠᠭᠠᠨᠠᠷ; Chinese: 巴林部) are a Mongol subgroup related to the Khalkhas. They live in Baarin Left Banner and Baarin Right Banner of Inner Mongolia, China.

== See also ==
- Bayan of the Baarin-general of Mongol Empire.
- List of medieval Mongol tribes and clans
