= Jalairs =

Mongol tribe

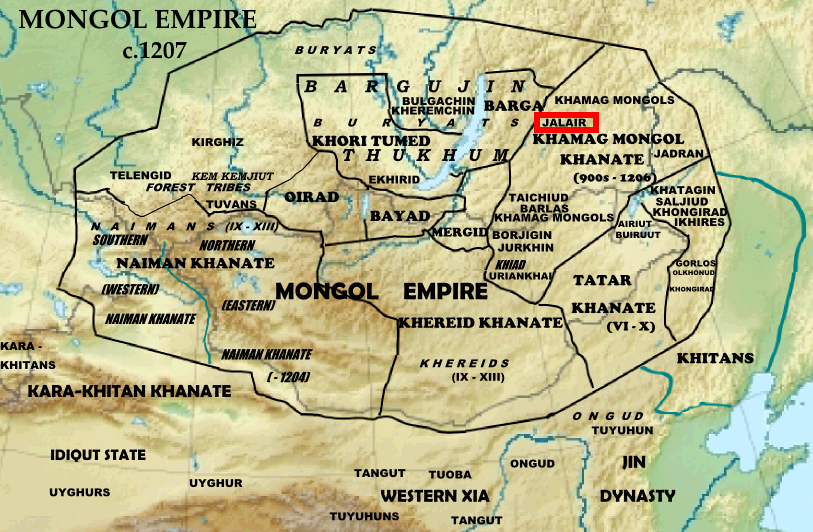
Homeland of the Jalair tribe of the Mongol Empire in 1207.

Jalair (Note: English: /dʒəˈlɛər/ jə-LAIR; Chinese: 札剌亦兒; pinyin: Zhálàyìer; Dungan: Җалайир; pronounced [tʂǎlâjîa̯ɚ]; Mongolian: Жалайр, romanized: Jalair, mongolized: ᠵᠠᠯᠠᠢᠷ, pronounced [tɕɐɮɛ́ːr]; Karakalpak: Жалайыр, romanized: Jalayır; Kazakh: Жалайыр, romanized: Jalaiyr, arabized: جالابىر, pronounced [ʒɑɫɑjə́r]; Kyrgyz: Жалайыр, romanized: Jalaiyr, arabized: جالابىر, pronounced [dʑɑɫɑjɯ́r]; Uzbek: Jaloyir, cyrillized: Жалойир, arabized: جلایر, pronounced [dʒalɒˈjɪɾ]; Persian: جلایر, romanized: Jalâyer, cyrillized: Ҷалоир, pronounced [dʒælɒːˈjeɹ]) also Djalair, Yyalair, Jalayir, is a tribe of Mongolic or Turkic origin. They are first recorded as the Chaladi in Chinese sources of 910 in eastern Inner Mongolia. They are later recorded as having lived along the Kerulen River and Orkhon River in modern day Central and Eastern Mongolia, between the Merkits and Keraits. After the Mongol conquest in the 13th century many Jalairs spread over Central Asia and the Middle East. Jalairs become part of various Mongolic and Turkic peoples. Jalairs are one of the founding tribes of Mongolia's largest ethnic group Khalkha. People with the clan name of Jalayir are also found in Inner Mongolia in China. The Jalayirs who stayed in Central Asia under the rules of Genghis Khan's older sons' descendants eventually become part of various Turkic people of central asia. They are found among the Kazakhs of the Great jüz; also they are found among the Uzbeks (especially among Uzbeks of Southern Tajikistan and Afghanistan), Karakalpaks, and the Kyrgyz. The Jalairs who went to Iran and Iraq founded the Jalairid Sultanate in 1330, and expanded into Turkey. The state was subjugated by the Kara Koyunlu in 1432.

== Etymology ==
Yury Zuev proposed that the term Jalair (~ Yyalair) could be the Mongolian version of the Turkic name for the dynastic tribe of the Uyghur Khaganate (758-843): Yaglakar clan ~ yağla er ('anointed sovereign', Turkic ya:ğ il). Yaglakar (Ch. 藥羅葛/药罗葛 Yaoluoge) of the Tiele-Uyghur Toquz Oghuz confederacy.

Some scholars hypothesise that the Jalairs were related to the Xiongnu Empire based in Mongolia (209 BC – 93 AD) and Mongolian speakers.

== Clans ==
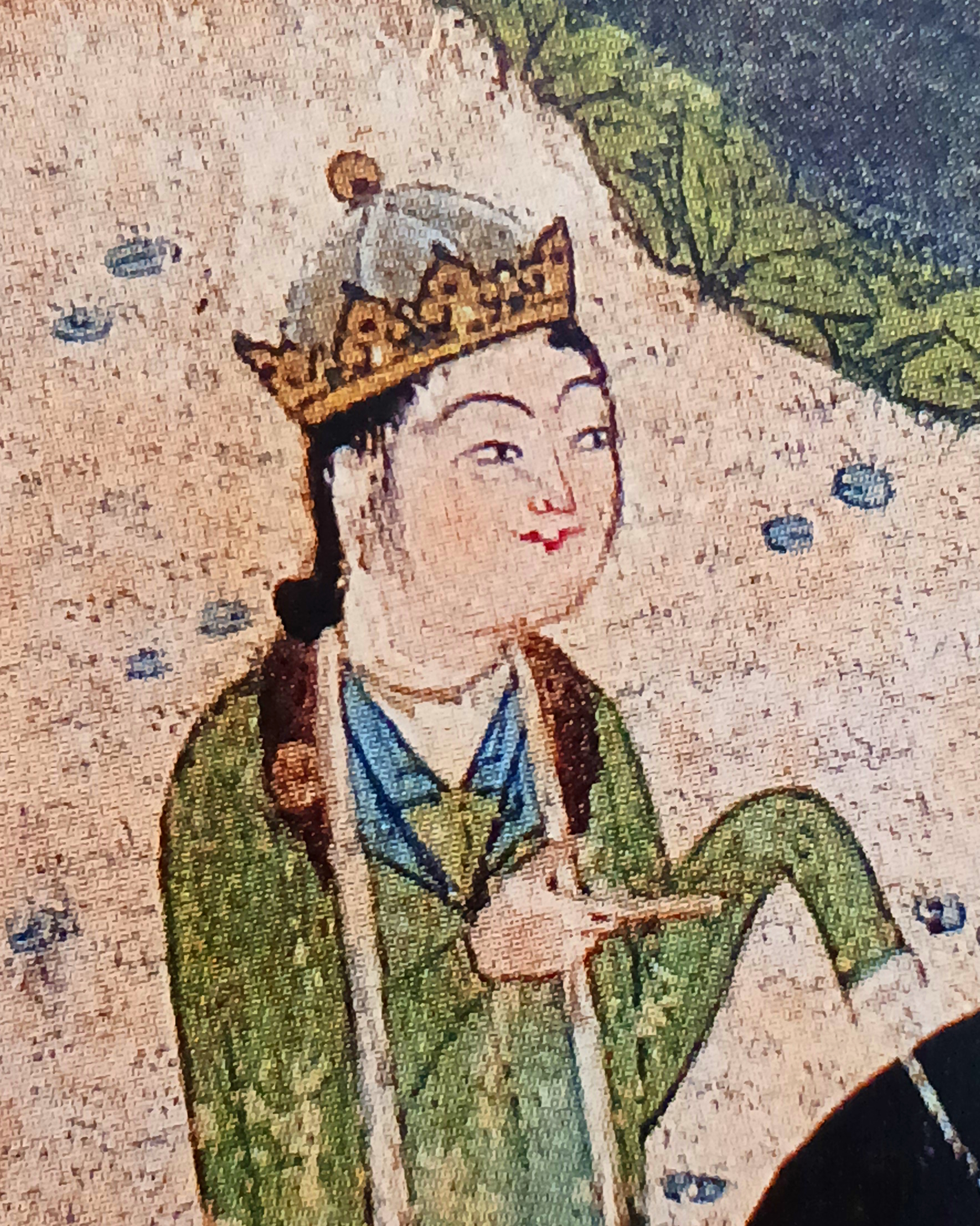
Contemporary portrait of Mongol Jalayir Sultan Ahmad Jalayir in Baghdad (ruled 1382–1410). Khamsah by Khvaju Kirmani (1396), Baghdad.

According to the early 14th-century work Jami' al-tawarikh by Rashid-al-Din Hamadani,:

The Jalayir nation consists of ten large divisions, each of which has become a separate and numerous tribe: Jait, Oongaqa’ut, Oyat, Kirkin, Turi, Togra’ut, Kiimsa’ut, Nilqan, Tolanggait, Sungqut.

== Early history ==
The Jalair might be the Chaladi who were recorded in Chinese sources of 910 in eastern Inner Mongolia. The Jalairs revolted against the Khitan rule in 1014. Subsequently, they were suppressed by the Khitans in the next year. After that, the Jalayirs turned to the Mongols and lived next to Borjigins. Later, the Mongols under Khaidu of the Borjigin, an ancestor of Chinggis Khan, conquered and made them hereditary slaves (Ôtegii boghol) of the Mongols around 1060.

The Jalair tribesmen were an important force in the Khamag Mongol confederation in the 12th century and later Chinggis Khan's rise to power. The Jalairs such as Mukhulai helped Genghis Khan to found his Empire. During the Mongol invasion of Khorazm in 1219–1223, Muqali campaigned in North China as the first prince of the state (guo-wang) and a viceroy. The Jalairs served under Great Khans as steward, chief judge, imperial tutor and advisor. Genghis Khan also gave 1,000 men under Jalair Moqe noyan to his son Chagatai Khan in Turkestan. And a body of the Jalair settled in Golden Horde.

== Medieval Jalairs ==
When Möngke Khan ordered Hulagu (Alaghu) to conquer the Abbasid caliphate, the Ayyubids in Syria and the Mamluks in Egypt in 1252, the Jalairs prepared strong military contingent. Their commander Kok-Elege participated sieges of Persian and Arab fortresses from 1256 to 1261 and the battle against Berke's commander Nogai Khan in 1262.

Under Genghis Khan's successors, Muqali's descendants inherited his title and came to be one of the mainstays of Confucian influence in Kublaid Yuan Dynasty (1271–1368). The Jalairs were close to Great Khans in China and Il-khans in Iran. In Il-khanate, Jalair Buqa revolted against Tekuder Khan and installed Hulagu's grandson Arghun in 1284. But his coup was revealed and executed by his protégé later. After the death of Qazan Khan (r. 1343-1346), Chagatai Khanate fell under the control of nomadic Turco-Mongol clans: the Jalayir in the north, the Arlat in the west, the Barlas in the centre, the Qaraunas and the Qa'uchin in the south-west and the Dughlats in the east.

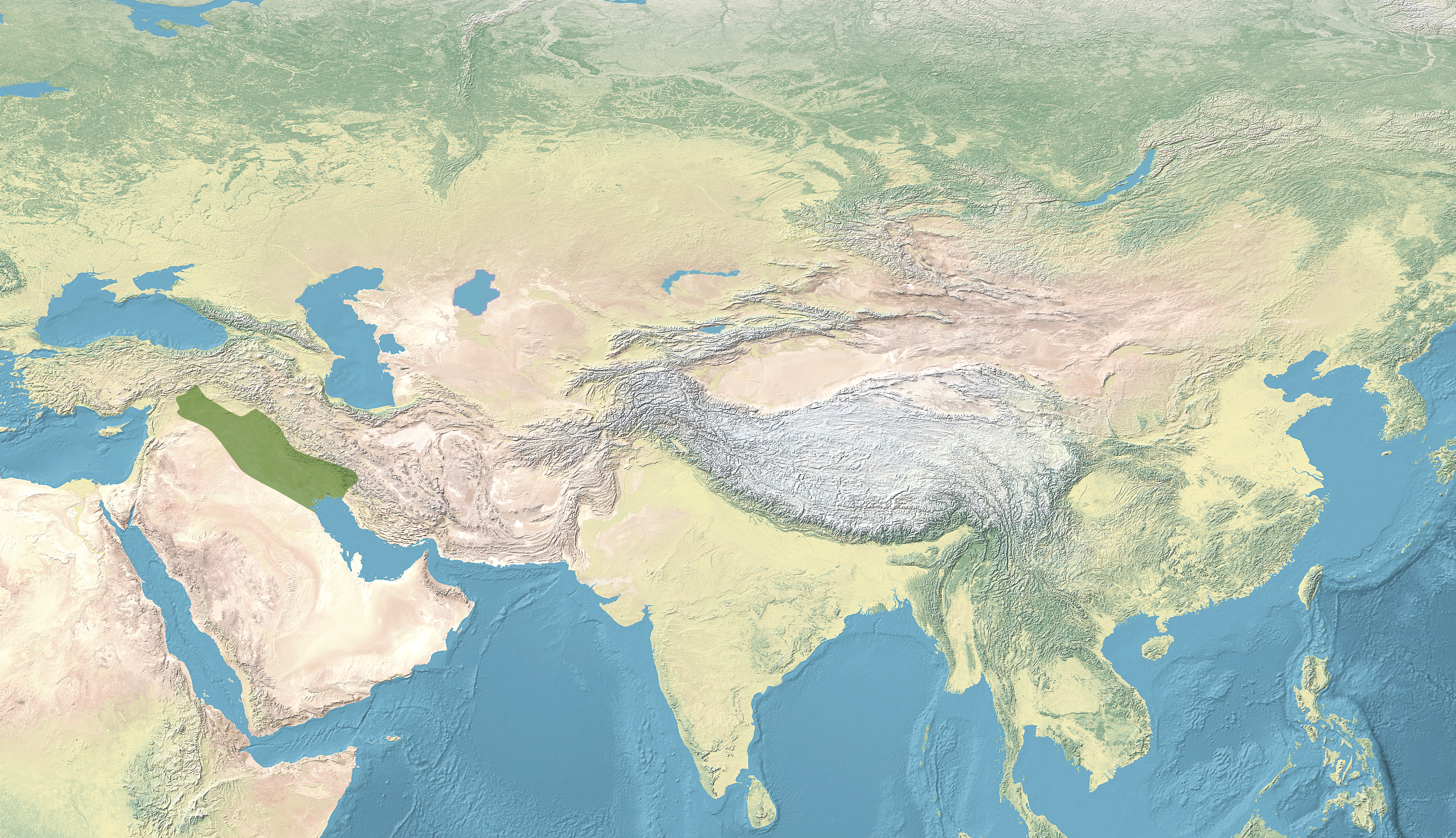
Origin location of the Jalairs in Mongolia, and territory of the Jalayirids circa c. 1400 ( ).

Meanwhile, Hasan Buzurg established Jalayirid Dynasty and tried to reunite Turco-Mongol states in the name of his puppet khans in Iraq and western Persia of which fell into political chaos after the death of Il-khan Arpa Ke'un in 1336. When Tamerlane ravaged the Jalayirid Dynasty of Ahmad (1383–1410), Central Asian Jalairs were one of main clans in both Timurid Empire and Moghulistan. The Jalairids in Persia were finally overthrown by Kara Koyunlu Turks in 1432. But the Jalayirs in Central Asia were active for two more centuries.

In the 16th century, the Jalairs played important role in Eastern and Central Mongolian politics. They were one of the 14 clans of Khalkha tumen and Dayan Khan's son Gersenji was written in Mongolian chronicles as the prince of Jalayir (Jalaid). On the brink of the Manchu defeat of the last Great Khan Ligden, the Jalaid became an ally of the rising Manchu empire

== Modern Jalairs ==
=== Mongolia ===
Jalairs are part of the Khalkha people of Mongolia. As of October 2024, there were more than 11,000 people with the clan name of Jalayir in Mongolia.

=== Siberia ===
Chat Siberian Tatars originate from Jalairs, as one of Jalair clans is named Jait. There is also a Siberian Tatar village called Salairka (Siberian Tatar: Салайыр) in Tyumensky District of Tyumen Oblast.

=== China ===
In China, the Jalaids are a clan and a banner in the Jirim and Ordos Leagues, and Chahar of Inner Mongolia.

=== Iran ===
Timur brought 400 Jalair families to Khorasan. They live in Kalat-i-nadiri. Until end of the 19th century, Kalat-i-nadiri had its own hereditary chief of Jalayir tribe, who held the fortress as feudatories of Persia. Under Nader Shah Afshar, Jalayirs rose to power and held important official positions within Persian government and military:

- Qasem Ali Khan Jalayir - military commander during reign of Nader Shah Afshar.
- Subedar Khan Jalayir - military commander during reign of Nader Shah Afshar.
- Zal Khan Jalayir - military commander during reign of Shahrukh Afshar.

Hereditary rulers of Kalat-i-nadiri:

- Tahmasp Qoli Khan Jalayir - vizier and military commander during reign of Nader Shah Afshar.
- Yousef Ali Khan Jalayir - vizier and military commander during reign of Shahrukh Afshar.
- Fath Ali Khan
- Yalangtush Khan I (d.1826) - son of Fath Ali Khan, during the reign of Fath Ali Shah Qajar
- Sayd Mohammad Khan - son of Fath Ali Khan and brother to Yalangtush Khan I, during the reign of Fath Ali Shah Qajar
- son of Yalangtush Khan (d.1883)
- Yalangtush Khan II (reigned from 1883 to 1885)

=== Indian subcontinent ===
There were Jalairs who served in the Mughal Empire as officials such as Mirak Bahadur Jalair.

=== Central Asia ===
Today Jalayir clans are a member of the Senior Jüz tribal union in Kazakhstan, they also are part of Uzbeks, Karakalpaks, and Kyrgyz.

==== Jalair tribe in the Kazakh people ====
From ancient times, Jalair tribe (Жалайыр in Kazakh Cyrillic, Jalaiyr in Kazakh Latin) is one of the major Kazakh tribes, in Kazakhstan, Jalairs belong to the Kazakh Senior Juz, they live mostly in the north, north-east and in the middle part of Kazakhstan, such as Saryarka region, Karagandy province, Akmola province, and east Kazakhstan province. Jalairs also are a part of few Kazakh populations in Uzbekistan and Russia (see the Jalair tribe of Kazakh people - from Wikipedia Jalair introduction in Kazakh language).

== Sources ==
- Bosworth, C.E.; Crane, H. (1984). "AḴLĀṬ". Encyclopaedia Iranica, Vol. I, Fasc. 7. pp. 725–727.
- Christopher P. Atwood - Encyclopedia of Mongolia and the Mongol Empire ISBN 978-0-8160-4671-3, Facts on File, Inc. 2004.
- The Chinese government. By William Frederick Mayers, George Macdonald Home Playfair. Published by Kelly & Walsh, Limited, 1886.
- René Grousset "The Empire of the Steppes - a History of Central Asia" ISBN 0-8135-0627-1, Rutgers University Press, 6th paperback edition, 1999
