= Zubu =

Common name for various Mongol, Kerait, Naiman, and Tatar tribes

Zubu (Chinese: 朮不姑 or 阻卜 or 阻䪁, also referred to as Dada or Tatars) was the common name of Khamag Mongol, Khereid, Naiman and Tatar tribes from the 10th to 12th centuries. Little is known in detail about this group. The name "Zübü" might means “left” in Khitan language, or might be derived from Xiongnu's ruling tribe Xubu.

== Relations with the Khitan ==
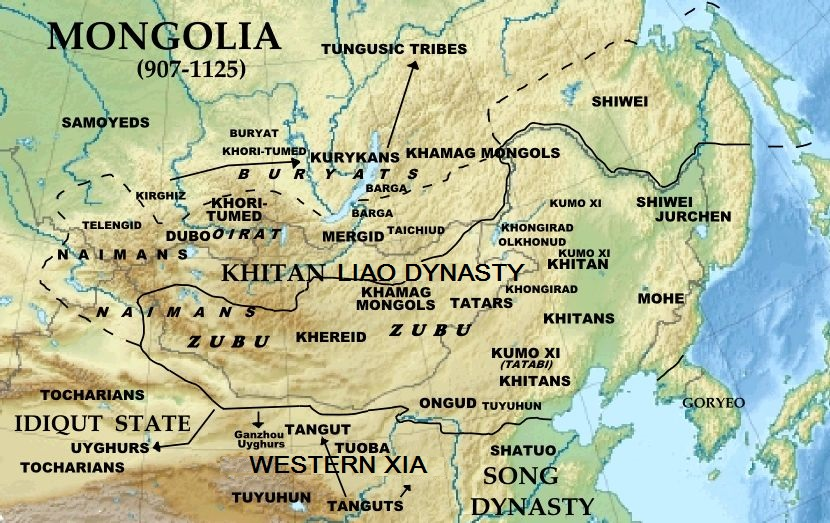

The Zubu began paying tribute to the Khitan Empire after a campaign in 924 when the Khitan subdued the Zubu and in the region of what is now Eastern and Central Mongolia and southeastern Russia.

Liao emperor Shengzong led an expeditionary force against the Zubu in 983 after the Zubu killed their own khan and began to act in defiance of the Khitan. The Zubu khan was forced to submit to the Liao in 1003. On this occasion, the Liao divided the Zubu into several divisions, each under a Liao ruler.

The Zubu once again rebelled against their Khitan masters in 1026 but suffered another defeat. On this occasion, they were forced to pay an annual tribute of horses, camels, and furs.

In the 1090s, the Zubu once again defied the Khitan by invading the northeast borders of Liao territory. In 1100, the Zubu were once again defeated, and their khan was taken prisoner and taken to the Liao capital of Shangjing. Once in the Liao capital, he was hacked to pieces.
