= Proto-Mongols =

People and tribes in and around the Mongol Plateau before the 11th or 12th century

The Proto-Mongols emerged from an area in Central and Northeast Asia that had been inhabited by humans as far back as 45,000 years ago during the Upper Paleolithic. The people there went through the Bronze and Iron Ages, forming tribal alliances, peopling, and coming into conflict with early polities in the Central Plain.

The Proto-Mongols formed various tribal regimes that fought against one another for supremacy, such as the Rouran Khaganate (330–555), until it was defeated by the Göktürks, who founded the First Turkic Khaganate (552–744), which in turn was subdued by the growing strength of the Tang dynasty. The destruction of the Uyghur Khaganate (744–848) by the Yenisei Kyrgyz resulted in the end of Turkic dominance on the Mongolian Plateau.

The Para-Mongol Khitan people founded the Liao dynasty (916–1125) and ruled Mongolia and portions of the eastern coast of Siberia now known as the Russian Far East, northern Korea, and North China. Over the next few hundred years, the Jurchens in China subtly encouraged warfare among the Mongols as a way of keeping them distracted from invading China proper.

In the 12th century, Genghis Khan was able to unite or conquer the warring tribes, forging them into a unified fighting force that went on to create the largest contiguous empire in world history, the Mongol Empire.

== Origins ==
Archaeological evidence suggests that Upper Paleolithic hominins inhabited Mongolia as early as 45,000 years ago.

By the first millennium BC, bronze-working peoples lived on the Mongolian Plateau. With the appearance of iron weapons by the 3rd century BC, the inhabitants of Mongolia had begun to form clan alliances and lived a hunter and herder lifestyle.

The origins of more modern inhabitants are found among the forest hunters and nomadic tribes of Inner Asia. They inhabited a great arc of land extending generally from the Korean Peninsula in the east, across the northern parts of China to present-day Kazakhstan and to the Pamir Mountains and Lake Balkash in the west. During most of recorded history, this has been an area of constant ferment from which emerged numerous migrations and invasions to the southeast (into China), to the southwest (into Transoxiana—modern Uzbekistan, Iran, and India), and to the west (across Scythia toward Europe).

By the eighth century BC, the inhabitants of western Mongolia were nomadic Indo-European speakers, either Scythians or Yuezhi. In central and eastern parts of Mongolia were many other tribes, such as the Slab-grave culture and the Ordos culture.

== Xiongnu ==
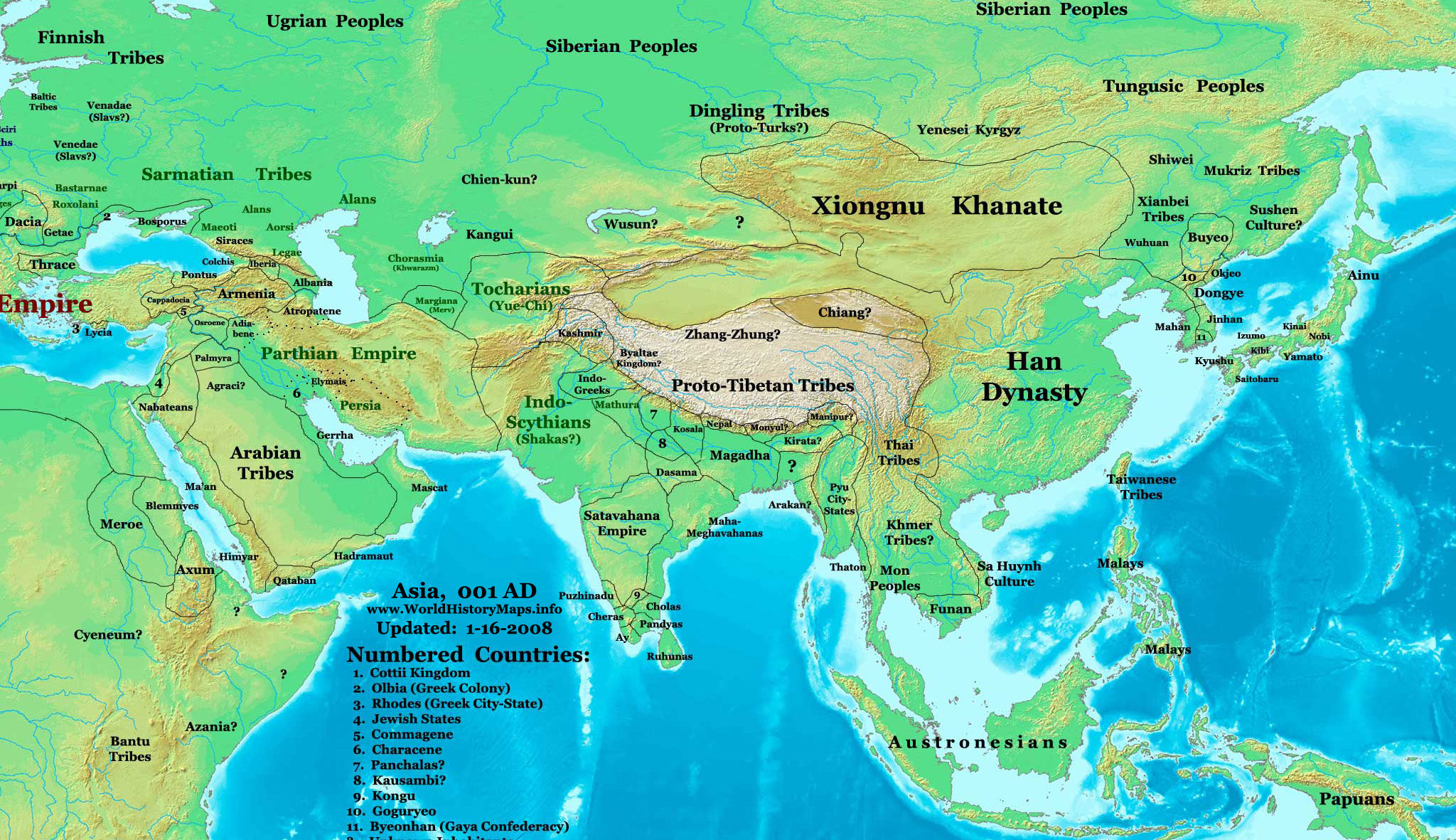
Location of Xiongnu and other steppe nations in 1 AD

According to a number of sources, one of the ancestors of the Mongols were the Xiongnu, although it is not known if they were Proto-Mongols.

The Xiongnu were a group of nomads who dominated the Asian steppe from the late 3rd century BC for more than 500 years. The Xiongnu invasions prompted the kingdoms of North China to begin erecting what later became the Great Wall.

The identity of the ethnic core of Xiongnu has been a subject of varied hypotheses and some scholars, including A. Luvsandendev, Bernát Munkácsy, Henry Hoyle Howorth, Bolor Erike, Alexey Okladnikov, Peter Simon Pallas, Isaac Jacob Schmidt, Hyacinth and Byambyn Rinchen, who insisted on a Proto-Mongolian origin. There are several other theories about the ethnolinguistic identity of the Xiongnu, such as Turkic, Yeniseian, Iranian, Uralic, multiethnic.

There are many cultural similarities between the Xiongnu and Mongols such as yurt on cart, mounted use of the composite bow, board game, horn bow and long song. The Mongolian long song is believed to date back at least 2,000 years. A mythical origin of the long song is mentioned in the Book of Wei, volume 113.

== Donghu, Tuoba, and Rouran ==
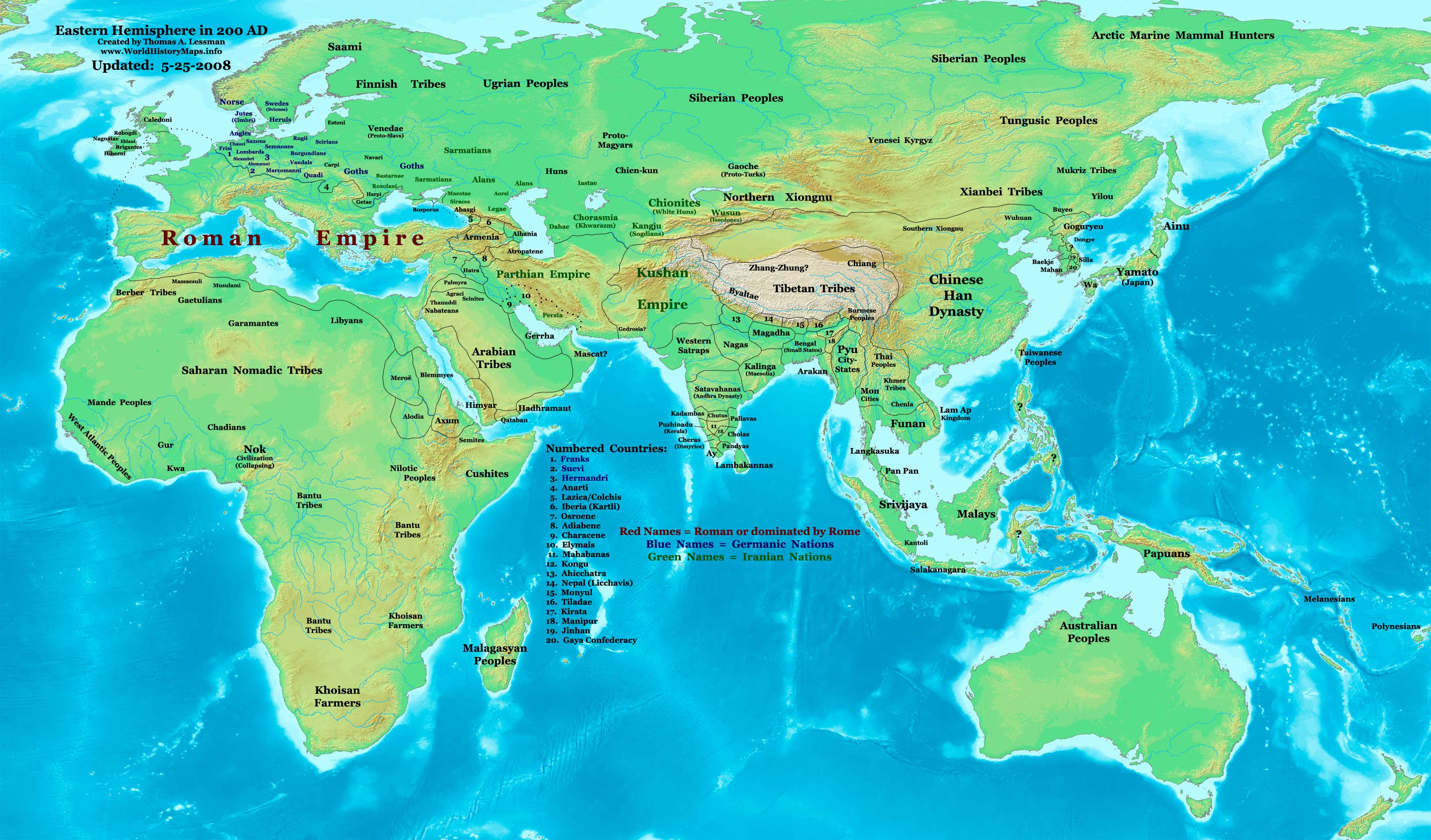
The Proto-Mongolic Xianbei and other steppe nations around 200 AD

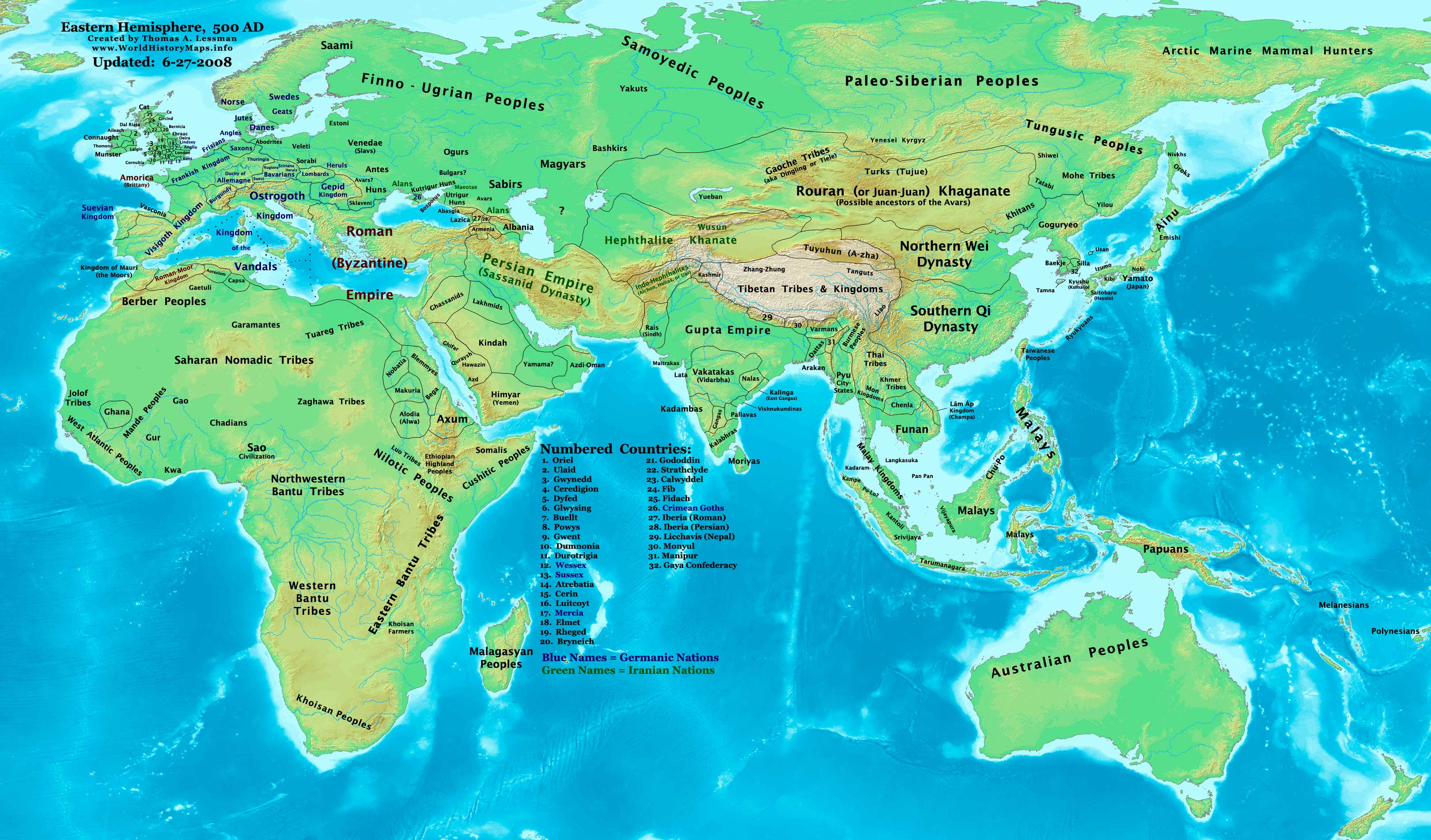
The Rouran Khaganate and contemporary continental Asian polities c. 500 AD

The Donghu (or Tung Hu, the Eastern Hu), a Proto-Mongol and/or Tungus group mentioned in Chinese histories as existing as early as the 4th century BC. The language of the Donghu, unlike that of the Xiongnu, is believed by modern scholars to be Proto-Mongolic. The Donghu were among the first peoples conquered by the Xiongnu. By the 1st century AD, the Donghu had split, along geographical lines in two: the Proto-Mongolic Xianbei in the north and the Wuhuan in the south. After the Xiongnu were driven back into their homeland by the Chinese (48 AD), the Xianbei (in particular) began moving (from apparently the north or northwest) into the region vacated by the Xiongnu.

By the 2nd century AD, the Xianbei had begun attacking Chinese farms south of the Great Wall, established an empire, which, although short-lived, gave rise to numerous tribal states along the Chinese frontier. Among these states was that of the Tuoba, a subgroup of the Xianbei, in modern China's Shanxi Province. The Wuhuan also were prominent in the 2nd century, but they disappeared thereafter; possibly they were absorbed in the Xianbei western expansion. The Xianbei and the Wuhuan used mounted archers in warfare, and they had only temporary war leaders instead of hereditary chiefs. Agriculture, rather than full-scale nomadism, was the basis of their economy. In the 6th century, the Wuhuan were driven out of Inner Asia into the Russian steppe.

Chinese control of parts of Inner Asia did not last beyond the opening years of the 2nd century AD, and, as the Eastern Han dynasty ended early in the 3rd century AD, suzerainty was limited primarily to the Hexi Corridor. The Xianbei were able to make forays into a China beset with internal unrest and political disintegration. By 317 AD all of China north of the Yangtze River had been overrun by nomadic peoples: the Xianbei from the north; some remnants of the Xiongnu from the northwest; and the Chiang people of Gansu and Tibet (present-day China's Xizang Autonomous Region) from the west and the southwest. Chaos prevailed as these groups warred with each other and repulsed the vain efforts of the fragmented Chinese kingdoms south of the Yangtze River to reconquer the region.

By the end of the 4th century, the region between the Yangtze and the Gobi Desert, including much of modern Xinjiang, was dominated by the Tuoba. Emerging as the partially sinicized state of Dai between 338 and 376 AD in the Shanxi area, the Tuoba established control over the region as the Northern Wei Dynasty (386–533 AD). Northern Wei armies drove back the Rouran (referred to as Ruanruan or Juan-Juan by Chinese chroniclers), a newly arising nomadic Mongol people in the steppes north of the Altai Mountains, and reconstructed the Great Wall. During the 4th century also, the Huns left the steppes north of the Aral Sea to invade Europe. By the middle of the 5th century, Northern Wei had penetrated into the Tarim Basin in Inner Asia, as had the Chinese in the 2nd century. As the empire grew, however, Tuoba tribal customs were supplanted by those of the Chinese, an evolution not accepted by all Tuoba.

The Rouran, only temporarily repelled by Northern Wei, had driven the Xiongnu toward the Ural Mountains and the Caspian Sea and were making raids into China. In the late 5th century, the Rouran established a powerful nomadic empire spreading generally farther north of Northern Wei. It was probably the Rouran who first used the title khan.

== Rise of the Göktürks ==
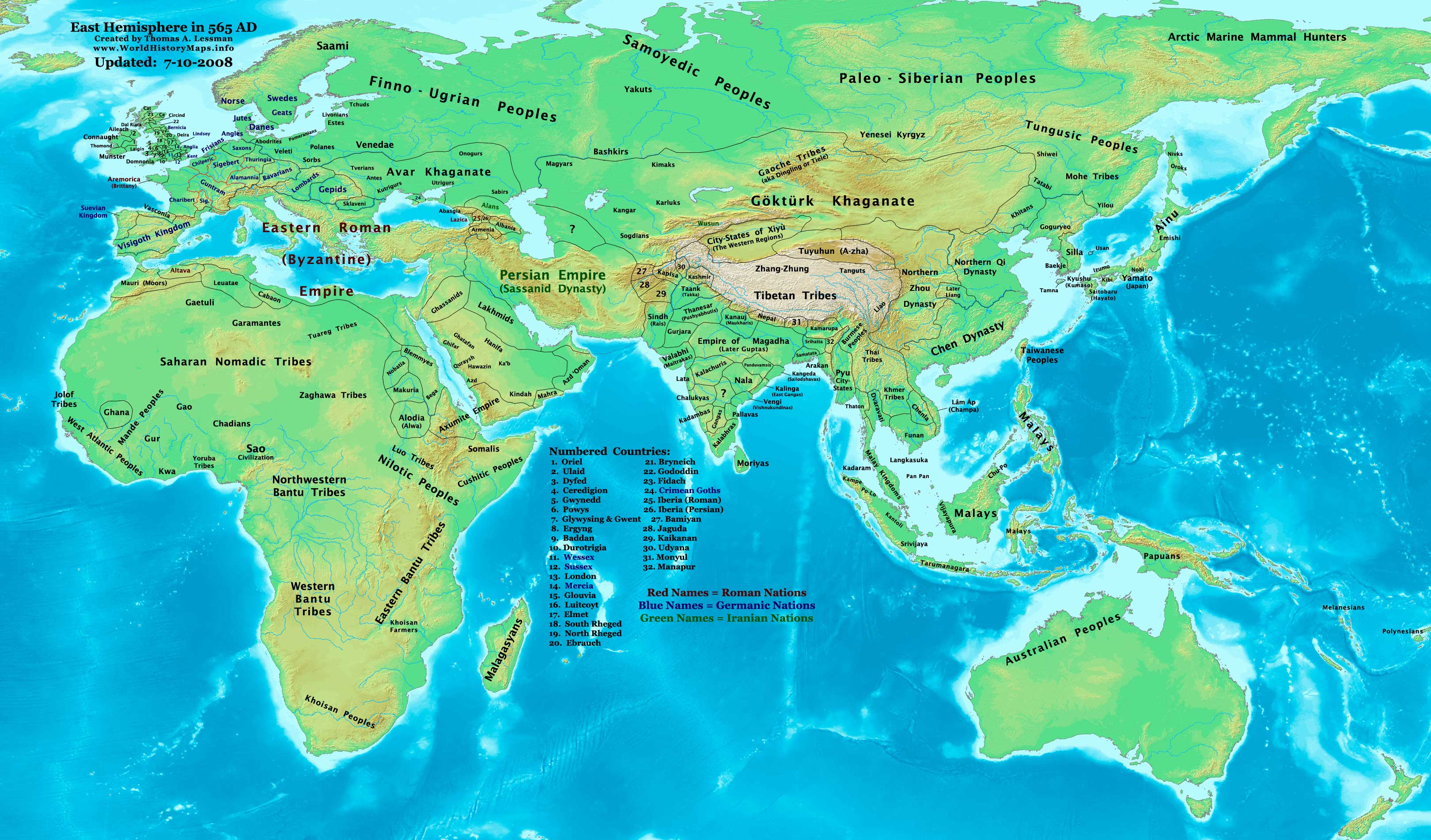
Asia in AD 565, showing Göktürk Khaganate and its neighbors

Northern Wei was disintegrating rapidly because of revolts of semi-tribal Tuoba military forces that were opposed to being sinicized, when disaster struck the flourishing Rouran Khaganate. The Göktürks, known as Tujue to Chinese chroniclers, revolted against their Rouran rulers. The uprising began in the Altai Mountains, where many of the Türks were serfs working the iron mines. Thus, from the outset of their revolt, they had the advantage of controlling what had been one of the major bases of Rouran power. Between 546 and 553, the Göktürks overthrew the Rouran and established themselves as the most powerful force in North Asia and Inner Asia. This was the beginning of a pattern of conquest that was to have a significant effect upon Eurasian history for more than 1,000 years. The Göktürks were the first people to use this later widespread name. They are also the earliest Inner Asian people whose language is known, because they left behind inscriptions in a runic-like Orkhon script, which was deciphered in 1896.

It was not long before the tribes in the region north of the Gobi—the Eastern Göktürks—were following invasion routes into China proper used in previous centuries by Xiongnu, Xianbei, Tuoba, and Rouran. Like their predecessors who had inhabited the mountains and the steppes, the attention of the Göktürks quickly was attracted by the wealth of China proper. At first these new raiders encountered little resistance, but toward the end of the 6th century, as China proper slowly began to recover from centuries of disunity, border defenses stiffened. The original Göktürk state split into eastern and western parts, with some of the Eastern Göktürk acknowledging Sui overlordship.

For a brief period at the beginning of the 7th century, a new consolidation of the Göktürks, under the Western Göktürk ruler Tardu, again threatened China proper. In 601 Tardu's army besieged Chang'an (modern Xi'an), then the capital of the Sui dynasty. Tardu was turned back, however, and, upon his death two years later, the Göktürk state again fragmented. The Eastern Göktürk nonetheless continued their depredations, occasionally threatening Chang'an.

== Tang Dynasty and the Uyghur Empire ==
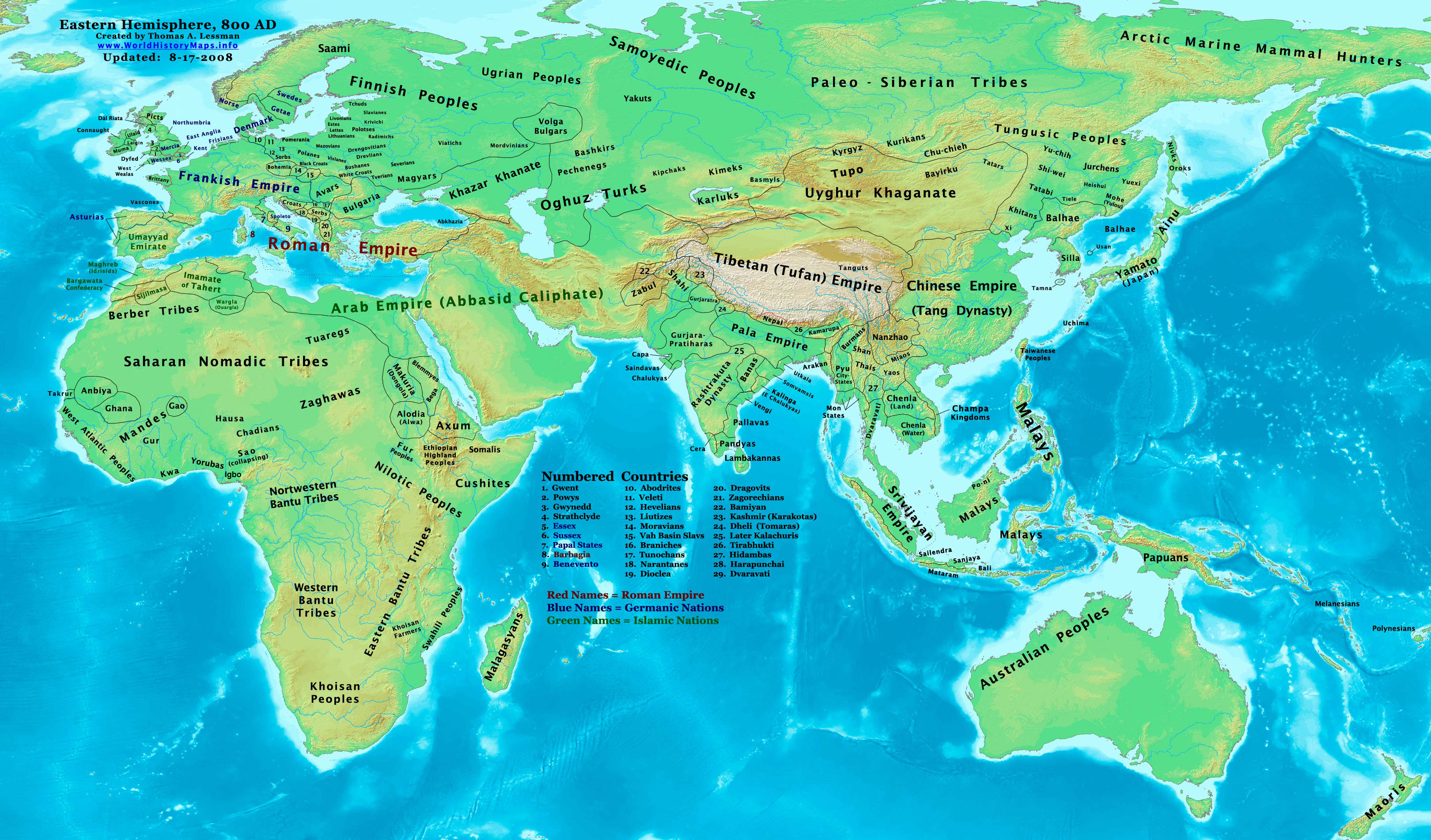
Asia in 800 AD, showing the Uyghur Khaganate and its neighbors

From 629 to 648, a reunited China proper under the Tang dynasty (618–907) destroyed the power of the Eastern Göktürk north of the Gobi; established suzerainty over the Khitans, a semi-nomadic proto-Mongol people who lived in areas that became the modern Chinese provinces of Heilongjiang and Jilin; and formed an alliance with the Uyghurs, who inhabited the region between the Altai Mountains and Lake Balkash. Between 641 and 648, the Tang conquered the Western Göktürk, reestablishing Chinese control over Xinjiang and exacting tribute from west of the Pamir Mountains. The Göktürk empire finally ended in 744.

For half a century, the Tang retained control of Central Asia and modern-day Mongolia and parts of Inner Asia. Both sides of the Great Wall came under Tang rule. During this period, the Tang expanded Chinese control into the Oxus Valley. At the same time, their allies, the Uyghurs, conquered much of western and northern Mongolia until, by the middle of the 8th century, the Uyghur seminomadic empire extended from Lake Balkash to Lake Baykal.

Despite these crippling losses, the Tang recovered and, with considerable Uyghur assistance, held their frontiers. Tang dependence upon their northern allies was apparently a source of embarrassment for its rulers, who surreptitiously encouraged the Kirghiz and the Karluks to attack the Uyghurs, driving them south into the Tarim Basin. As a result of the Kirghiz action, the Uyghur empire collapsed in 846. Some of the Uyghurs emigrated to the Turpan Depression, where they established the Kingdom of Qocho that freely submitted to Genghis Khan several centuries later. Ironically, this weakening of the Uyghurs undoubtedly hastened the decline and fall of the Tang Dynasty over the next fifty years.

== Khitan and Jurchen ==
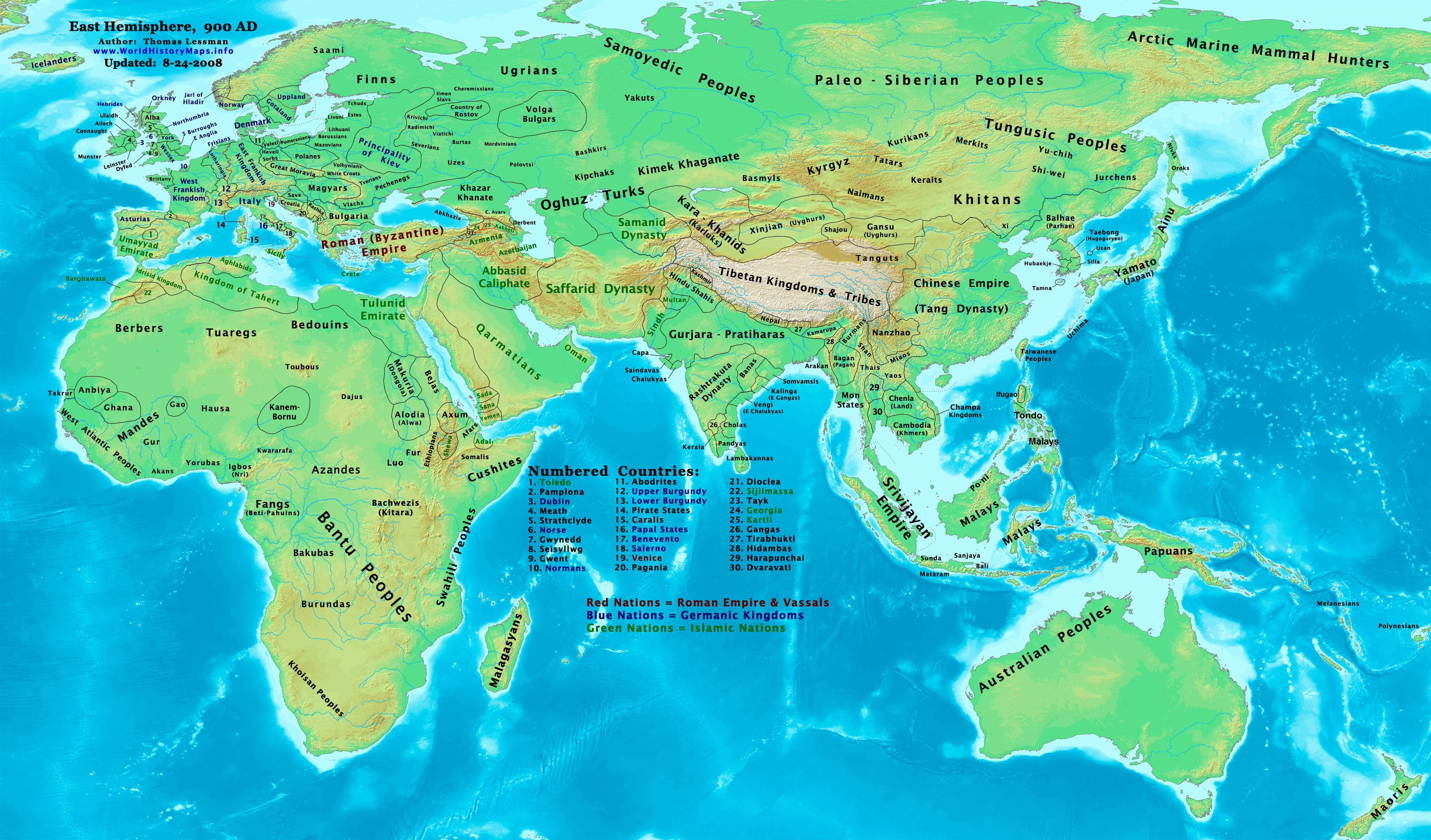
Asia in 900 AD, showing location of the Khitan people and their neighbors

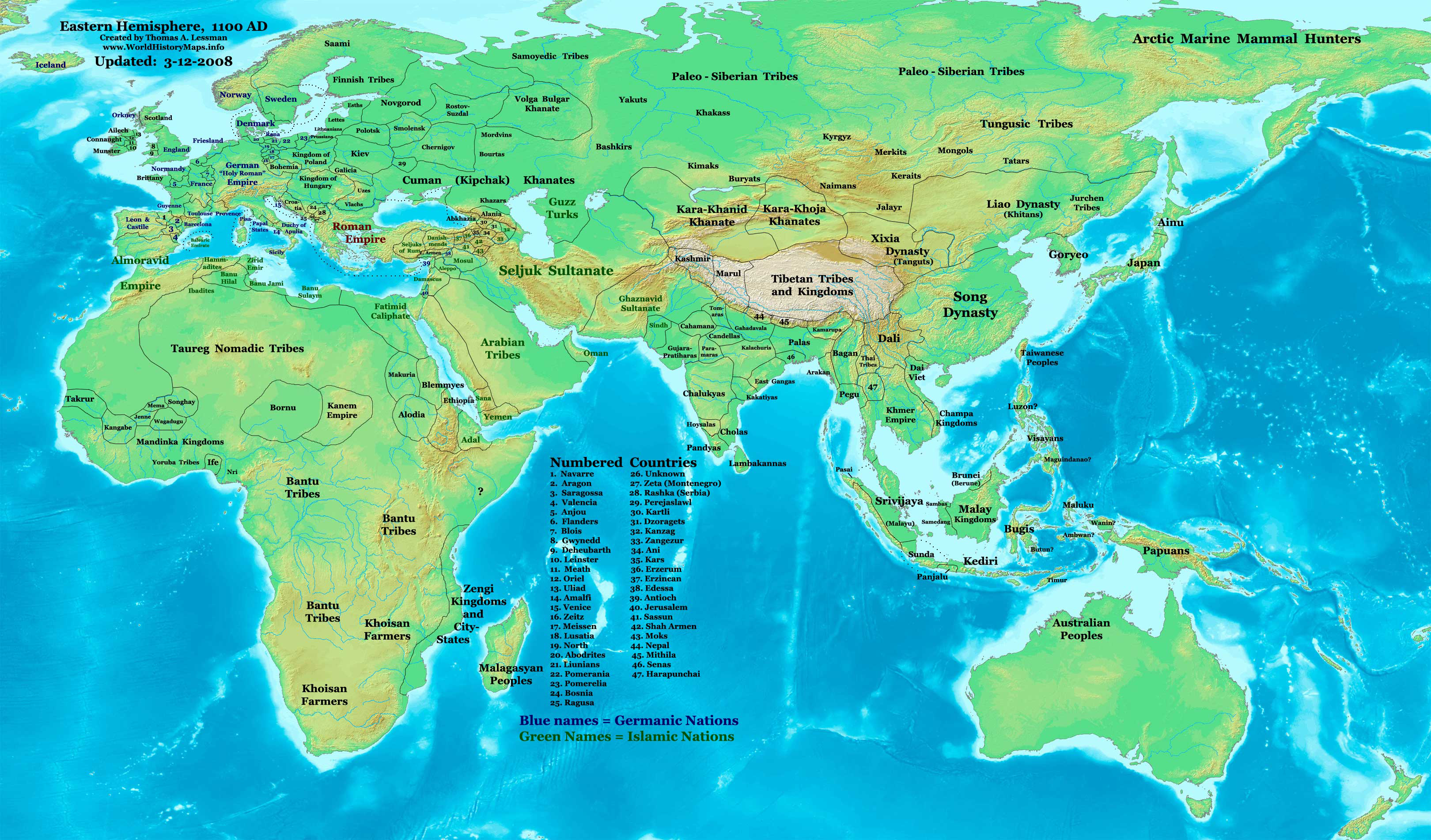
The Liao dynasty and main polities in Asia c. 1100

Free of Uyghur restraint, the Para-Mongolic Khitan expanded in all directions in the latter half of the 9th century and the early years of the 10th century. By 925 the Khitan ruled eastern Mongolia, most of Manchuria, and the Sixteen Prefectures of northern China. By the middle of the 10th century, Khitan chieftains had declared themselves as Chinese emperors and chose a dynastic name in the Chinese fashion; their rule was known as the Liao dynasty (916–1125).

The period of the 11th and 12th centuries was one of consolidation, preceding era of Genghis Khan. During those centuries, the vast region of deserts, mountains, and grazing land was inhabited by people resembling each other in racial, cultural, and linguistic characteristics; ethnologically they were essentially Mongol. The similarities among the Mongols, Göktürk, and Tatars who inhabited this region cause considerable ethnic and historical confusion. Generally, the Mongols and the closely related Tatars inhabited the northern and the eastern areas; the Göktürk (who already had begun to spread over western Asia and Eastern Europe) were in the west and the southwest; the Tangut, who were more closely related to the Tibetans than were the other nomads and who were not a Turkic people, were in eastern Xinjiang, Gansu, and western Inner Mongolia. The Liao state was homogeneous, and the Khitan had begun to lose their nomadic characteristics. The Khitan built cities and exerted dominion over their agricultural subjects as a means of consolidating their empire. To the west and the northwest of Liao were many other Mongol tribes, linked together in various tenuous alliances and groupings, but with little national cohesiveness. In Gansu and eastern Xinjiang, the Tangut—who had taken advantage of the Tang decline—had formed a state, Western Xia (1038–1227), nominally under Song suzerainty. Xinjiang was dominated by the Uyghurs, who were loosely allied with the Song dynasty.

The people of Mongolia at this time were predominantly spirit worshipers, with shamans providing spiritual and religious guidance to the people and tribal leaders. There had been infusion of Buddhism.

A Tungusic people, the Jurchen, ancestors of the Manchu, formed an alliance with the Song and reduced the Liao dynasty to vassal status in a seven-year war (1115–1122). The Jurchen leader proclaimed himself the founder of a new Chinese dynasty, the Jin dynasty. Scarcely pausing in their conquests, the Tungusic Jurchen subdued neighboring Goryeo (Korea) in 1226 and invaded the territory of their former allies, the Song, to precipitate a series of wars with China that continued through the remainder of the century. Meanwhile, the defeated Liao ruler had fled with the small remnant of his army to the Tarim Basin, where he allied himself with the Uyghurs and established the Qara Khitai state (known also as the Western Liao dynasty, 1124–1234), which soon controlled both sides of the Pamir Mountains. The Jurchen turned their attention to the Mongols who, in 1139 and in 1147, warded them off.

== Shiwei and Menggu ==
Some Shiwei tribes, though little is known, have been considered the ancestors of the Mongols according to ancient Chinese records. Term "Shiwei" was an umbrella term of the Mongolic and some Tungusic peoples from the 6th to 12th centuries. During the 5th century, they occupied the area east of the Greater Khingan Range, what is the Hulun Buir, Ergune, Nonni (Noon), Middle Amur, and the Zeya Watersheds. They may have been divided into five to twenty tribes. They were said to be dressed in fish skins. They may have been nomadic, staying in the marshy lowlands in the winter and the mountains during the summer. The burial was by exposure in trees. Their language is described as being similar to Manchu-Tungusic languages and Khitan. The Türk dynasties (550–740) installed tuduns, or governors over the Shiwei and collected tribute. Other Shiwei may have stayed and become the Ewenkis. The Kitans conquered the Shiwei during the late 9th century. One Shiwei tribe, living near the Amur and Ergune rivers, was called the "Menggu" (Mongol). A few scholars believe they, other Shiwei tribes, and many other peoples from the area moved west from the forest to the Mongolian proper steppe.

== States established by Proto-Mongols ==
The Proto-Mongols founded many states such as the Xianbei state, the Rouran Khaganate, and the Liao dynasty.

Name	Years	Area	Map	Capital
Bida state (Our state)				
Xianbei
Xianbei state	93–234			Orda, Khangai Mountains, Mongolia
Western Qin	385–431			Yongshicheng (385–386); Wanchuan (386–388, 400, 410–412) Jincheng (388–395); Xicheng (395–400); Dujianshan (409–410); Tanjiao (412); Fuhan (412–429); Dinglian (429–430); Nan'an (430–431)
Murong Xianbei
Former Yan	337–370			Jicheng (337–341); Longcheng (341–350); Jicheng (350–357); Yecheng (357–370)
Western Yan	384–394			Chang'an (385–386); Zhangzi (386–394)
Later Yan	384–409			Zhongshan (386–397); Longcheng (397–409)
Tuyuhun	284–672			Fuqi
Tuoba Xianbei states
Southern Liang	397–414			Lianchuan (397–399); Ledu (399, 402–406, 410–414); Xiping (399–402); Guzang (406–410)
Dai	315–377			Shengle
Northern Wei	386–535	2,000,000 km^{2}(450)		Shengle (386–398, capital of former Dai, near modern Huhhot); Pingcheng (398–493); Luoyang (493–534); Chang'an (534–535)
Eastern Wei	534–550	1,000,000 km^{2}(550 AD)		Luoyang (534); Yecheng (534–550)
Western Wei	535–557	1,300,000 km^{2}(557 AD)		Chang'an
Yuwen Xianbei
Northern Zhou	557–581	1,500,000 km^{2}(577 AD)		Chang'an
Rouran
Rouran Khaganate	330–555	4,000,000 km^{2}(405 AD)		Mumo City, in Mongolia
Khitans (sometimes considered to be Para-Mongolic)
Liao dynasty	907–1125	2,600,000 km^{2}(947); 4,000,000 km^{2}(1111)		Shangjing
Dongdan Kingdom	926–936			
Northern Liao	1122–1123			
Western Liao (Qara Khitai)	1124/1125–1221	2,500,000 km^{2}(1210)		Balasagun
Eastern Liao	1211–1220			
Later Liao	1216–1219			
Qutlugh-Khanid dynasty	1220s–1306			
Kumo Xi (Tatabi)
Great Xi	1123			

== See also ==
- Ethnic groups in Chinese history
- Five Barbarians
- Guifang
- List of medieval Mongol tribes and clans
- List of Mongol states
- Mongol Empire
- Urheimat
