= Khaduli Barlas =

Borjigin Prince & Administrator of Mongol

- Barlas prince

Administrator of Khamag Mongol Confederation
- Administration: 12th–Century
- Khan: Khabul Khan
- Born: Approximately 1090s/1100 CE. Mongolia
- Died: 12th–Century AD. Khamag Mongol
- Issue: Erumduli Barlas
Era dates
- (12th–Century)
- Dynasty: House of Borjigin
- Father: Tumanay Khan
- Mother: Setchen
- Religion: Tengrism
- Occupation: Borjigin Prince; Military commander Administrator; Adviser

Qachuli/Qhachuli Barlas or, also known as Kachuli/Khachuli/Khaduli Barlas, (Mongol: Хадули Барлас; b. 1090s/1100 – d. 12th Century AD.) was a Borjigin prince of the Barlas subclan. He was the son of Tumbinai Khan and twin-brother of Khabul Khan who was the founder of the Khamag Mongol. Historians mention him as a ''full-brother'' of Khabul Khan as they were twins from the same mother; Khabul served the Khamag Mongol as a military leader, minister and advisor (r. 1130 – 1148). He was the paternal ancestor of Timur through his great-grandson Qarachar Barlas (1166 – 1256), of the Barlas clan. He fought along with Khabul against China, winning victories for the Khamag Mongol confederacy. His son Erumduli Barlas also served in the Mongol administration.

== Biography ==
Qachuli Barlas was the son of Tumbinai Setsen Khan, also known as Tumanay Setsen Khan (his mother's name was Setchen). He was the twin-brother of Khabul Khan who was the first ruler and founder of the Khamag Mongol Khanate.
