= Barlas =

Turco-Mongolian aristocratic tribal confederation clan

Barlas ᠪᠠᠷᠤᠯᠠᠰ Барлас برلاس Barulas
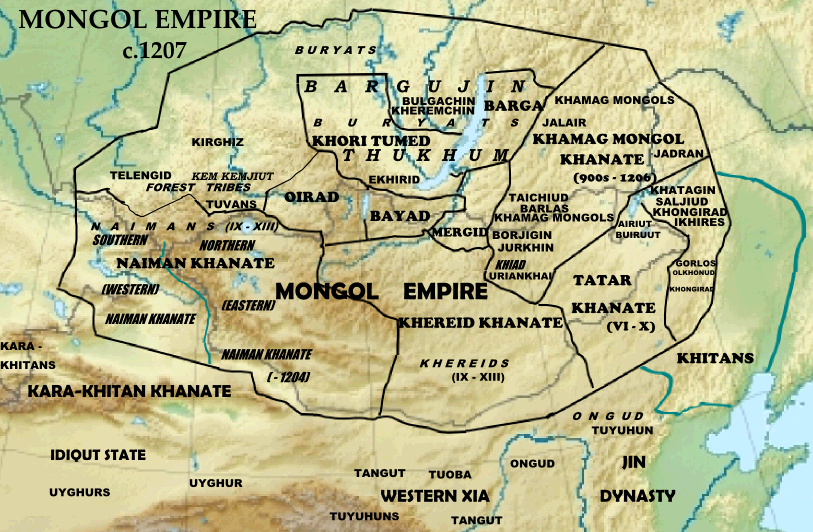
- Constitutive tribes of the Khamag Mongol Confederations the Barlas were showing in 1207
- Parent house: Borjigin
- Country: Mongol Empire; Chagatai Khanate; Transoxiana
- Current region: Central Asia
- Origin: Khamag Mongol Confederation
- Founded: Early to Mid 12th-Centuries
- Founder: In Mongolia: Qachuli Barlas In Transoxiana: Qarachar Barlas
- Titles: Khan; Sheikh; Mirza; Beg; Shah; Sardar; Emir; Ghazi; Sultan
- Traditions: Tengrism later Sunni Islam
- Estates: Kesh; Samarkand
- Cadet branches: Timurid Dynasty; Mughal Dynasty; Muhammad Khwaja Tribe; Ahmadiyya Caliphs

The Barlas (Mongolian: ᠪᠠᠷᠤᠯᠠᠰ, Барлас, romanized: Bārulās; Chagatai Turkic/Persian: برلاس, Barlās; also Berlās) were a Mongol tribe which later underwent Turkification in Central Asia, forming a nomadic confederation. Barlas were originally a sub-clan of the Borjigin, which emerged within the Khamag Mongol confederation in present-day Mongolia in the early to mid-12th century CE, and traced their military roots to Kheshig Guard, one of the elite regiments of the Mongol Empire. The Barlas produced imperial dynasties of two major empires in Asia: the Timurid Empire in Central Asia and Persia; and the Mughal Empire in the Indian subcontinent.

== History ==
=== Origins ===
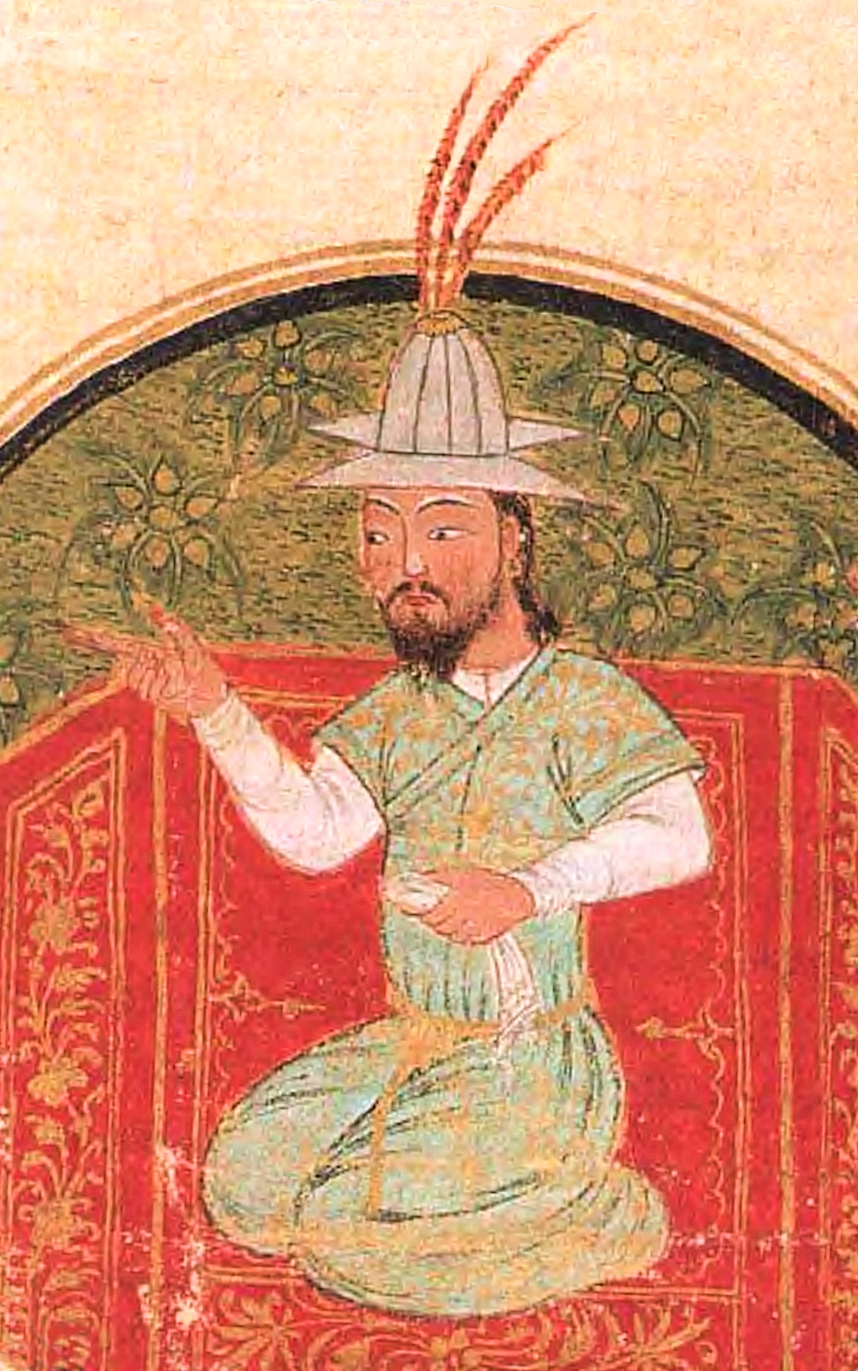
Portrait of Timur, a member of the Barlas. Painted in 1405–1409.

According to the Secret History of the Mongols (written during the reign of Ögedei Khan [r. 1229–1241]) and historian Rashid al-Din Hamadani (1247–1318) who wrote the Jami' al-tawarikh, the Barlas shared ancestry with the Khiyad Borjigin, who were the descendents of Khaidu Khan. He also noted that the Barlas' relationship with the imperial Mongol ruling clan was through a common ancestry via Tumbinai Khan, who was both Timur and Genghis Khan's ancestor. Rashid al-Din Hamadani also traced the ancestry of the imperial clan of Genghis Khan and his successors, as well as other related Mongol clans. The progenitor of the Barlas clan is Qachuli, who founded the tribe in Khamag Mongol in Northern Mongolia; Qachuli was either the son of Tumanay Setsen or Tumbinai Khan (the chief of the Borjigin), as well as the twin brother of Qabul Khan, the founder and first ruler of the Khamag Mongol Confederations. Qachuli's great-grandson was Qarachar Barlas, a minister (Noyan) and military commander of a (Tumen) under Genghis Khan; during the Mongol Invasions of Central Asia, he migrated and established new settlements in the regions of Central asia and Transoxiana. Genghis Khan later assigned Qarachar to be a minister and governor (Darughachi) of Transoxiana under the command of Chagatai Khan.

The Barlas controlled the region of Kish (modern day Shahrisabz, Uzbekistan) and all of its lineages seem to have been associated with this region. In contrast to most neighboring tribes who remained nomadic, the Barlas were a sedentary due to their military and aristrocratic natures and status of tribe. Due to extensive contacts with the native population of Central Asia, the tribe had adopted the religion of Islam , leaving behind their forefather's Tengrism, and as native Mongol speakers, they adopted the Chagatai language, a Turkic language of the Qarluq branch, which was heavily influenced by Arabic and Persian. Although the Barlas were not always exogamous, but many marriages recorded were outside the tribe.

=== Timurids and Mughals ===
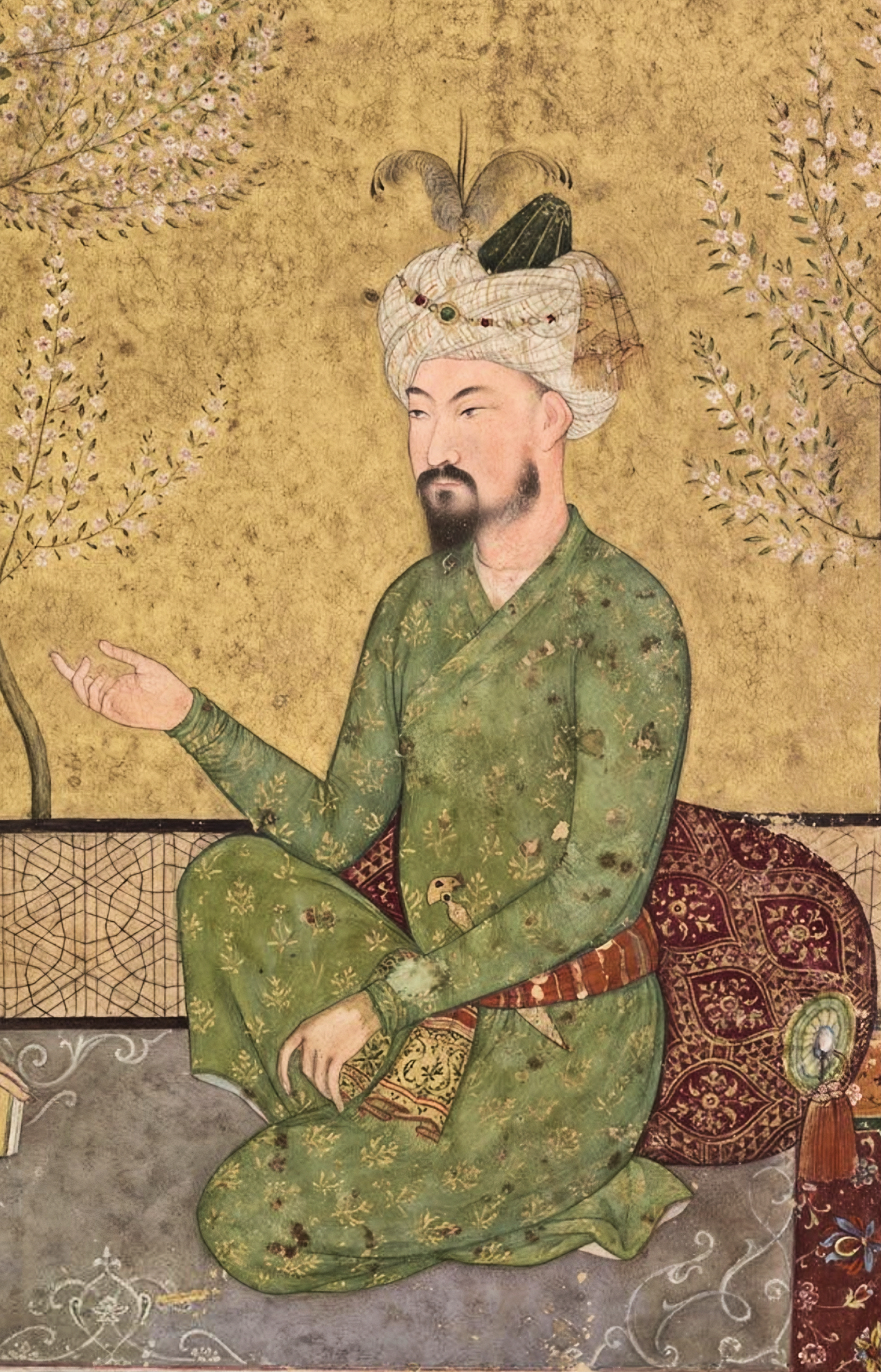
Babur, founder of the Mughal Empire. Late Shah Jahan Album, painted c. 1640.

Its most famous representatives were the Timurids, a dynasty founded by the conqueror Timur in the 14th century, who ruled over modern-day Iran, Armenia, Azerbaijan, Georgia, and almost the entire rest of the Caucasus, Afghanistan, much of Central Asia, as well as parts of contemporary Pakistan, Mesopotamia, and Anatolia. One of his descendants, Babur, later founded the Mughal Empire of Central Asia and South Asia.

== See also ==
- Turco-Mongol tradition
- Hajji Beg Barlas
