= Khabul Khan =

Founder & Ruler of Khamag Mongol Confederation

- Founder & Khan of the Khamag Mongol
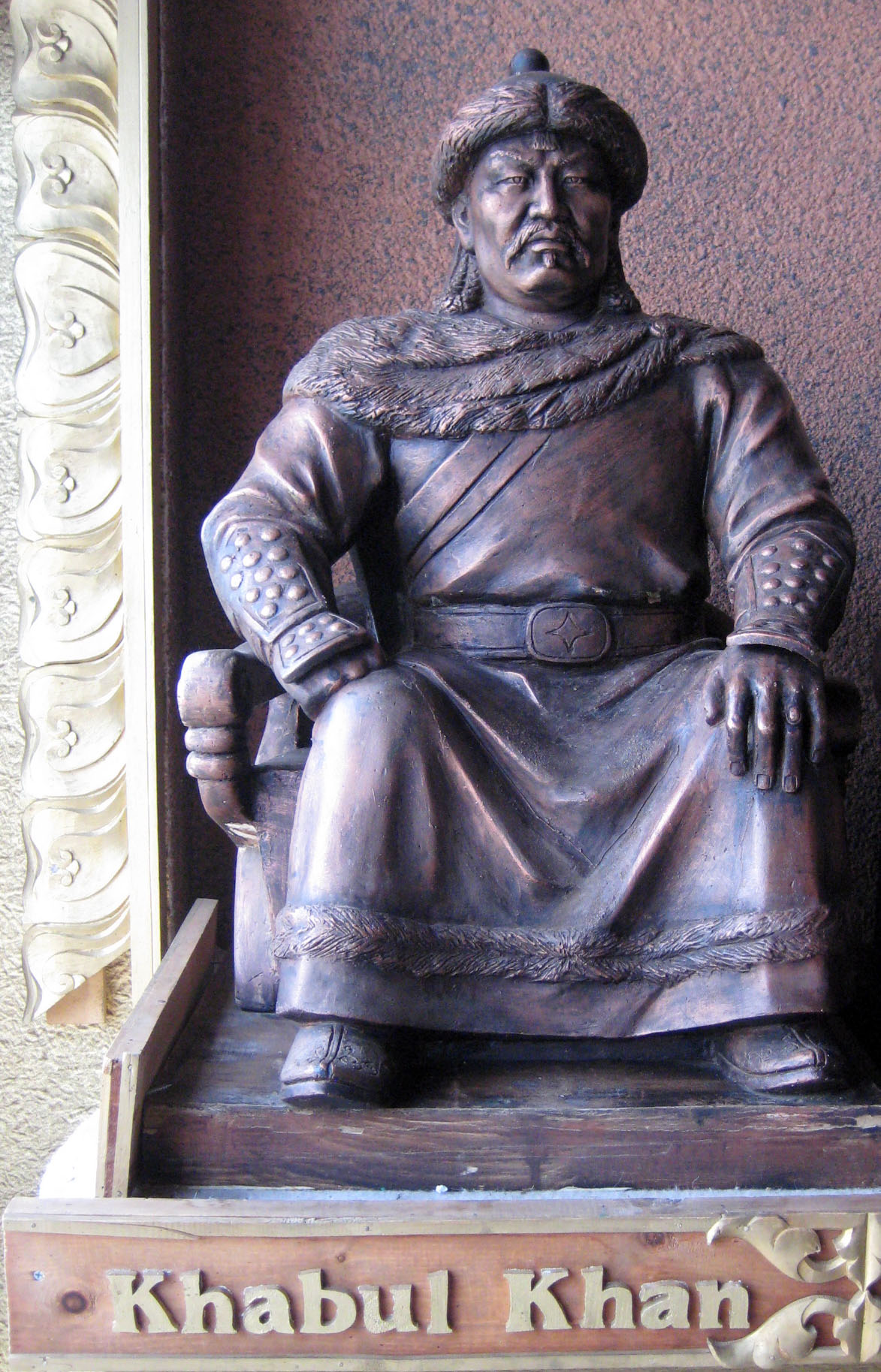
- Statue of Khabul Khan in Mongol Castle

Borjigin Khan & 1st Khan of the Khamag Mongol
- Reign: c. 1120s/1130s – 1148
- Coronation: In Khuruldai
- Predecessor: Tumbinai Khan
- Successor: Ambaghai Khan
- Born: 1090s/1100 Mongolia
- Died: 1148 (aged around 48–57); Khamag Mongol
- Spouse: Goa Kulkua
- Issue: Okhinbarkhag; Bartan Baghatur; Khutugtu Monkhor; Hotula Khan; Khulan; Khadaan Baghatur; Todoi
Names
- Khabul Khan (ᠬᠠᠪᠣᠯ ᠬᠠᠨ; Хабул хан)
Era dates
- 12th-Century
- House: Borjigin
- Father: Tumbinai Khan
- Mother: Setchen
- Religion: Tengrism

Khabul Khan (Mongolian: Хабул хан; Chinese: 合不勒), also rendered as Qabul Khan, Kabul Khan and Khabul Khagan, (b. 1090s/1100 – d. 1148 CE.) was the founder and first known Khan of the Khamag Mongol confederation, he was the great-grandfather of Genghis Khan the founding Khagan of the Mongol Empire, and twin-brother of Khaduli Barlas, who was in turn the ancestor of Timur, the founding ruler of the Timurid Empire.

== Family and background ==
Khabul Khan was a son of Tumbinai Khan and great-grandson of the Khaidu. He was the head of the Borjigin obog.

== Campaigns ==
Khabul Khan became quite notable for his clashes with the Jurchens, a people who lived in Manchuria and who later established the Jin dynasty in 1115, gradually taking control over the region. In alliance with the Chinese Song dynasty, they attacked the Khitan-led Liao dynasty, and by 1122 had captured a significant portion of Liao territory. In 1135, Khabul Khan was invited to the court of the Emperor Taizong of Jin, where he famously pulled the emperor's beard. The Jin army pursued him into southern Mongolia, but Khabul eluded capture and returned with a larger army to pillage the Jin dynasty.

When the Jin army entered Mongolia with the intention of conquering the territories ruled by the Emperor Dezong of Liao, the founder of the Qara Khitai, or Western Liao dynasty, it was Khabul Khan who organized a Mongol confederation and led the successful effort to repel this invasion.

The confederation was called the Khamag Mongol ("Whole Mongol") and consisted of the four core clans: Khiyad, Taichuud, Jalairs, and Jurkhin. It is sometime considered a predecessor state of Genghis Khan's empire. When the Jurchen accepted their defeat, they recognized Khabul Khan, in 1146 or 1147, as the paramount ruler of the Mongols, although they still officially considered him their vassal.

Khabul Khan has been described as having expanded his Mongol tribe and achieved incredible triumph in suppressing the Tatar tribes, an accomplishment in which he was aided by his son Yasukai. His reign saw the first attempts to politically unify the Mongols.

Though Khabul Khan had 7 sons, he nominated Ambaghai, a son of Sengun Bilge from the Taichuud clan, as his successor.

== Descendants and legacy ==
Khabul Khan had seven sons, the oldest being Okin-barkhakh and the second oldest Bartan the Valiant. Bartan, in turn, fathered Yesugei, the father of Genghis Khan. Khabul Khan's third son was Mongler, who fathered Buri the wrestler.

== See also ==
- Family tree of Genghis Khan

Khabul Khan House of Borjigin
Regnal titles
Preceded by New creation	Khan of the Khamag Mongol; 1131–1148/49	Succeeded by Ambaghai
