= Kaidu (11th century) =

11th-century Mongol ruler

Khaidu Khan ᠬᠠᠢ᠌ᠳᠤ
- Khan of the Kiyat Borjigin

Khan of the Kiyat Borjigin
- Reign: ? – 1100
- Predecessor: Hachi Hulug
- Successor: Bashinkhor Khan
- Born: c. 1025; Mongolia
- Died: c. 1100 (aged 74–75); Mongolia
- Issue: Bashinkhor Dogshin; Charaqai Lingqum
Era name and dates
- (Liao Era: 11th–Centuries)
- House: Kiyat Borjigin
- Father: Hachi Hulug
- Mother: Monolun
- Religion: Tengrism

Kaidu (/ˈkaɪdu/; b. 1025 – d. 1100; Middle Mongol: ᠬᠠᠢ᠌ᠳᠤ [ˈqʰaɪd̥ʊ], Modern Mongol: Хайду, Khaidu [ˈχæːtʊ̽]) was a Mongol ruler of the Borjigin clan who was the great-great-grandson of Bodonchar Munkhag (c. 850 – 900). Kaidu's great-grandson was Khabul Khan (died 1149), great-grandfather of Genghis Khan (1162–1227). His other great-grandson Khadjuli (died 12th century) was great-great-great-great-great-great-grandfather of Timur (1330s–1405). Kaidu was succeeded by his son Bashinkhor Dogshin.

== Life ==
Kaidu is mentioned in the Secret History of the Mongols, the History of Yuan shi, and the Jami al-Tawarikh. He was born circa. 1025 as the youngest of the eight sons of Queen Monolun, the widowed wife of Khachi Khulug, son of Menen Dutum. At this time, the Liao dynasty (907-1125) of the Mongolic Khitan had control over Mongolia, although the northernmost regions were difficult to keep under control. In the 1050s, the Khitans of the Liao dynasty attacked the Jalair, a Darligin Mongol tribe living along the Kerulen River in the far-eastern region of Mongolia. The Jalair fled to the Borjigin Mongols led by Queen Monolun (Nomulun in the Secret History), the mother of Khaidu. They killed Monolun and all her sons except Kaidu who was hidden by his uncle Nachin. Khaidu later conquered the Jalair and made them his subjects.

Rashid Al-Din says in the Jami Al-Tawarikh:

The Kerulen River is close to the area of the Khitans. Residents of Khitai, Jalair and other Mongol tribes had constant wars and clashes with each other. At that time a numerous army came from the Khitan raiding and plundering. When the Jalairs saw this army, they thought the Kerulen River would serve as a barrier. There was a ford at the river but they were sure the Khitan would be unable to cross the river. So they mockingly waved their hats and sleeves from the other side of the river shouting "Come and plunder our livestock!" Because the Khitan army was numerous they skilfully gathered dry branches and dead wood and in one night built a dam to cross of the river. The Khitans dealt a huge defeat on the Jalairs and plundered all their live stock and belongings. From all the Jalairs only one group of 70 tents escaped and fled away west with their wives and children reaching the boundaries of Monolun the wife of Dutum Menen (inaccurate, because she was actually the wife of Khachi Khulug son of Dutum Menen). Because the Jalairs were experiencing dreadful hunger they dug out the roots of a plant called sudusun which was regarded as edible in that area and ate it. They ended up leaving the horse pastures of Monolun's sons all dug up and full of holes. Monolun said "Why do you destroy and spoil the pastures of my sons?" For that the Jalairs seized Monolun and killed her. Her sons were all married to wives from different tribes and were numerous. The Jalair were afraid for their safety. So they also ambushed each of her sons and killed them. Her youngest son Khaidu was spending time as son-in-law among the Qanbagud tribe. Previous to that his uncle Nachin had also spent time with that tribe as son-in-law as mentioned beforehand (Mongols married in their pre-teens and spent many years as son-in-law). When Nachin learnt about the treacheries committed by the Jalairs and the death of his brother Dutum Menen's sons he hid Khaidu in a large vessel in which Mongols drained kumiss (fermented mare's milk) and kept him there. Soon other surrounding tribes including some Jalair asked the 70 tent Jalair: "With what right have you committed these atrocities?" and they all defeated them. Their wives and children all became slaves of Khaidu the son of the abovementioned Monolun.
