= Bodonchar Munkhag =

Mongol chieftain; ancestor of Genghis Khan and Timur

Bodonchar Munkhag Khan
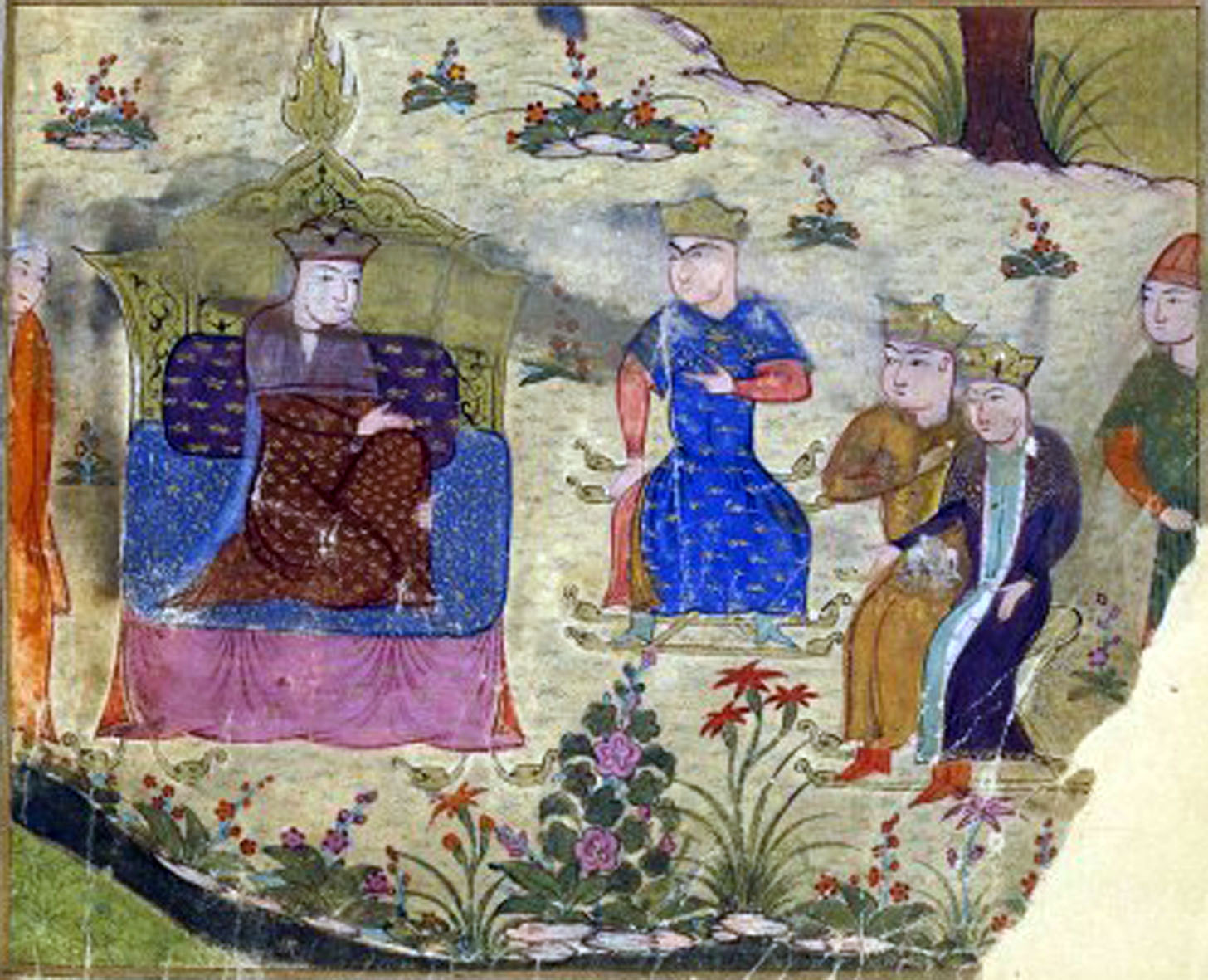
- Bodonchar (in blue) shown listening to his mother Alan Gua in an Iranian painting from 1430.

Founder and 1st Khan of the Borjigin
- Reign: 10th century
- Predecessor: Anqawi Khan
- Successor: Habich Baghatur
- Born: approx. around late 9th century between 880s–890s? Mongolia
- Died: Mid-10th century Mongolia
- Issue: Habich Baghatur; Baaridai; Khabu Baatar; Jeguredei; Barim Sïqïratu Qabichu
Temple name
- Shizu (始祖)
- House: Kiyat Borjigin
- Father: Anqawi Khan (Timurid scribes)
- Mother: Alan Gua (mythical)
- Religion: Tengrism

Bodonchar Munkhag (Note: Classical Mongolian: ᠪᠣᠳᠤᠨᠴᠠᠷ ᠮᠥᠩᠬᠡ; Khalkha Mongolian: Бодончар Мөнх) or Bodonchar Khan (fl. late-9th to mid-10th centuries) was a Mongol Borjigin chieftain and warlord. He was known as founding patriarch of Borjigins and as first ruler of the tribe. He was the patrilineal ancestor of Genghis Khan who was the founder of Mongol Empire in 1206, as well as the Turco-Mongol Barlas tribe of the Central Asian Turco-Mongol conqueror Amir Timur who was the founder of Timurid Empire in 1370.

== Account ==
According to the Secret History of the Mongols, he was the 12th generation nominal (non-biological) descendant of Borte Chino. Genghis Khan was the 11th and Timur was the 16th generation biological descendant of Bodonchar Munkhag. (sometimes written Butanchar the Simple). Bodonchar Munkhag is the founder of the House of Borjigin. Chagatai tradition dates 'Buzanjar Munqaq' to the rebellion of Abu Muslim or 747 CE. The name Borjigin does not come from Bodonchar but from Bodonchar's nominal great-grandfather Borjigidai the Wise (Borjigidai Mergen). The date 747 CE corresponds better with Borjigidai Mergen. A confusion with Bayanchur Khan could also account for this date discrepancy.

He was given the temple name Shizu (Chinese: 始祖; lit. 'Progenitor') during reign of Yuan dynasty in China.

According to Timurid scribes, Timur's father Taraqai told him that they were of the Descent of Bodonchar in 15th generational ancestry they tracing with him. The Timurid ruler Ulugh Beg's Tārīkh-i arbaʿ ulūs (lit. 'History of Four Nations'), abridged as the Shajarat al-atrāk (lit. 'Genealogy of Turks'), Timurids were descendants of Turk, son of Yāfith (Japheth). Turk was commonly referred as "Father of the Turks". Mughul and Tatar were twin brothers and children of Aljeh Khan, and therefore fifth generation descendants of Turk. Ulugh Beg's work on genealogy classified Mongols as Turks, while also praising their warrior spirit. Ulugh Beg included Yāfas (Japheth), Turk, Mughūl, Tātār and Ughūz in the genealogical record of the Genghisids and Timurids. More detail was given about Bodonchar's paternal than maternal ancestry. His father was Anqawi Khan; his grandfather, Qyal Khan; his great-grandfather, Ayi Khan; his great-great-grandfather, Tangez Khan; and his great-great-great-grandfather, Manqali Khan. Manqali was the great-grandson of Oghuz Khan, who was said to be a descendant of Mongol Khan. Bodonchar is the 28th generation in a family tree that traces lineages back to Adam, the first human and an Islamic prophet, about Bodonchar mother in Timurid Scribes, she was not necessarily mentioned because The Secret History of Mongols, mentioning her named as Alan Gua the mythological women.
