= Khamag Mongol =

Mongol khanate and tribal confederation (12th century-1206)

- 1120s/1130s–1206
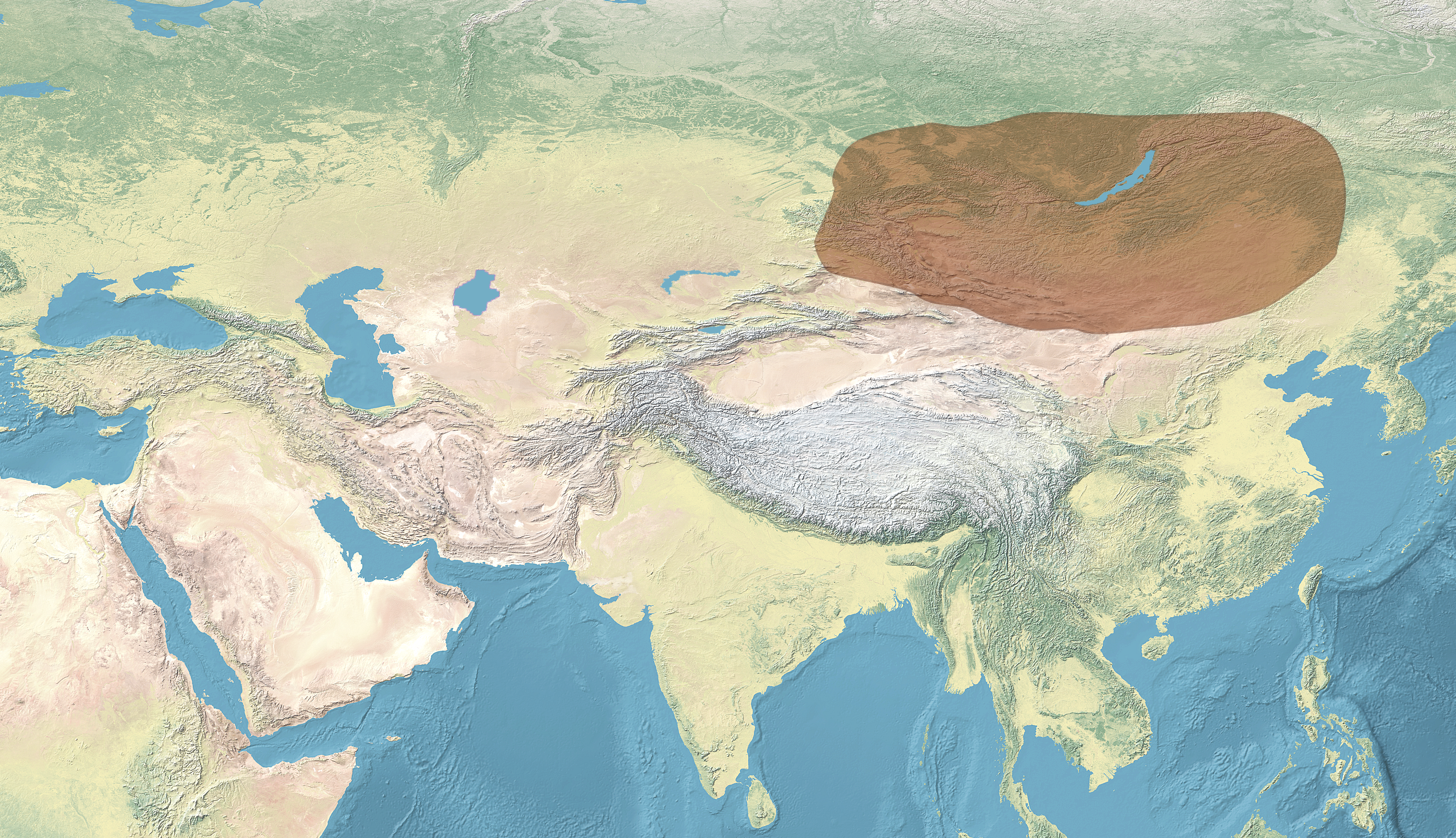
- The Mongol Confederation ( ) and contemporary polities in continental Asia circa 1200.
- Capital: Avarga
- Common languages: Middle Mongol
- Ethnic groups: Mongols
- Religion: Tengrism
- Government: Khanate
- Khan
  - ?–1148: Khabul Khan
  - 1148–1156: Ambaghai Khan
  - 1156–1160: Hotula Khan
  - 1160–1171: Yesugei
  - 1189–1206: Genghis Khan (last)
- History
  - Established: 1120s/1130s
  - Disestablished: 1206
| Preceded by | Succeeded by |
| Liao dynasty; Proto-Mongols | Mongol Empire |

Khamag Mongol (Mongolian: ᠬᠠᠮᠤᠭ
ᠮᠣᠩᠭᠣᠯ Хамаг Монгол, lit. 'Whole Mongol'; Chinese: 蒙兀國) was a Mongol tribal confederation on the Mongolian Plateau in the 12th century. It is considered to be a predecessor khanate of the Mongol Empire.

The existence of a somewhat mysterious tribal power known in Mongol tradition as Khamag Mongol Uls is recorded in sources of the Khitan-led Liao dynasty. After the fall of the Liao dynasty in 1125, the Khamag Mongols began to play an important role on the Mongolian plains. They occupied one of the most fertile lands of the country, the basins of the river Onon, Kherlen and Tuul Rivers in the Khentii Mountains. The Taichiud (Cyrillic: Тайчууд) was one of the three core tribes in the Khamag Mongol confederation in Mongolia during the 12th century and whose people lived in the southern part of Siberia's modern-day Zabaykalsky Krai. The present-day Zabaykalsky Krai and the Khentii Province of Mongolia were the core regions of the Khamag Mongol confederation. The Khamags consisted of the three core clans Khiyad, Taichuud, and Jalairs.

The first khan of Khamag Mongol recorded in history is Khabul Khan from the Borjigin clan. Khabul Khan successfully repelled the invasions of the Jurchen-led Jin armies. Khabul Khan was succeeded by Ambaghai Khagann of the Taichiud. Ambagai was captured by the Tatar confederation while delivering his daughter for marriage to their leadership. He was handed over to the Jin, who cruelly executed him. Ambaghai was succeeded by Hotula Khan, a son of Khabul Khan. Hotula Khan engaged the Tatars in 13 battles in an effort to obtain vengeance for the death of Ambagai Khan.

Khamag Mongol was unable to elect a khan after Hotula died. However, Khabul's grandson Yesugei, who was a chief of the Khiyad tribe, was an effective and preeminent leader of Khamag Mongol. Temujin, the future Genghis Khan, was born into Yesugei's family as the first son in Delüün Boldog on the upper reaches of the Onon river in 1162.

When young Tughril Khan asked for help from Yesugei, the ruler of the Khamag Mongol, (Note: He never assumed the title the Khan of the Khamag Mongol but baghatur (hero).) to dethrone his brothers among the Keraites, the Mongols helped him defeat the Keraite leaders and put him on the throne in the early 12th century.

Yesugei was poisoned by the Tatars and died shortly after in 1171, after which the Khamag Mongol began to disintegrate. Political anarchy and a power vacuum lasted until 1189 when Temujin became the Khan of the Khamag Mongol. War broke soon out between other Mongol tribes. Temujin's rival Jamukha was recognized by the rival tribes as Gurkhan (the universal ruler) in 1201 but he was defeated by the alliance of Khamag Mongol and Keraites.

When Tughril Khan refused to cement the alliance with the Khamag, Temujin's wars with the clans nearly destroyed him. Temujin united all clans on the Mongolian Plateau at last in 1206, when he was given the title Genghis Khan.

== Criticism ==
Mongolist B. R. Zoriktuev of Buryat origin criticized the concept of the existence of the state of "Khamag Mongol" as an independent political entity in the early 12th century. In his view, there was neither a tribe nor an ethnonym "Khamag Mongol" among the Mongols of the 12th century. The scholar notes that the expressions "Khamag Mongol" and "Khamag Mongol-Taichiut" occur only in two passages of the Secret History of the Mongols and are absent from other known sources.

According to him, scholars and translators of the source interpret the word "khamag" as a common noun meaning "the whole" or "all", rather than as part of an ethnonym. Accordingly, Zoriktuev concludes that there are no grounds for speaking of the existence of the ethnonym "Khamag Mongol" and, consequently, of a state named after such an ethnonym.

== See also ==
- List of medieval Mongol tribes and clans
