= Baljuna Covenant =

1203 oath sworn by Genghis Khan

An elderly Temüjin (Genghis Khan), depicted in a 14th-century Yuan era album

The Baljuna Covenant was an oath sworn in mid-1203 AD by Temüjin—the khan of the Mongol tribe and the future Genghis Khan—and a small group of companions, subsequently known as the Baljunatu. Temüjin had risen in power in the service of the Kereit khan Toghrul during the late 12th century. In early 1203, Toghrul was convinced by his son Senggum that Temüjin's proposal of a marriage alliance between his and their families was an attempt to usurp their power. After escaping two successive Kereit ambushes, Temüjin was cornered and comprehensively defeated at the Battle of Qalaqaljid Sands.

Temüjin regrouped the scattered remnants of his forces and retreated to Baljuna, an unidentified river or lake in south-eastern Mongolia. There, he and his closest companions swore an oath of mutual fidelity, promising to share hardships and glories. Having spent the summer recruiting warriors attracted by the ideals of his campaign, Temüjin amassed enough of a force to defeat the Kereit in battle that autumn. Three years later in 1206, having defeated all enemies on the steppe, Temüjin entitled himself Genghis Khan at a kurultai and honoured the Baljunatu with the highest distinctions of his new Mongol Empire. Nineteenth-century historians doubted the episode's historicity because of its omission (probably on account of the heterogeneity of the oath-swearers) from the Secret History of the Mongols, a 13th-century epic poem recounting Temüjin's rise.

== Background ==
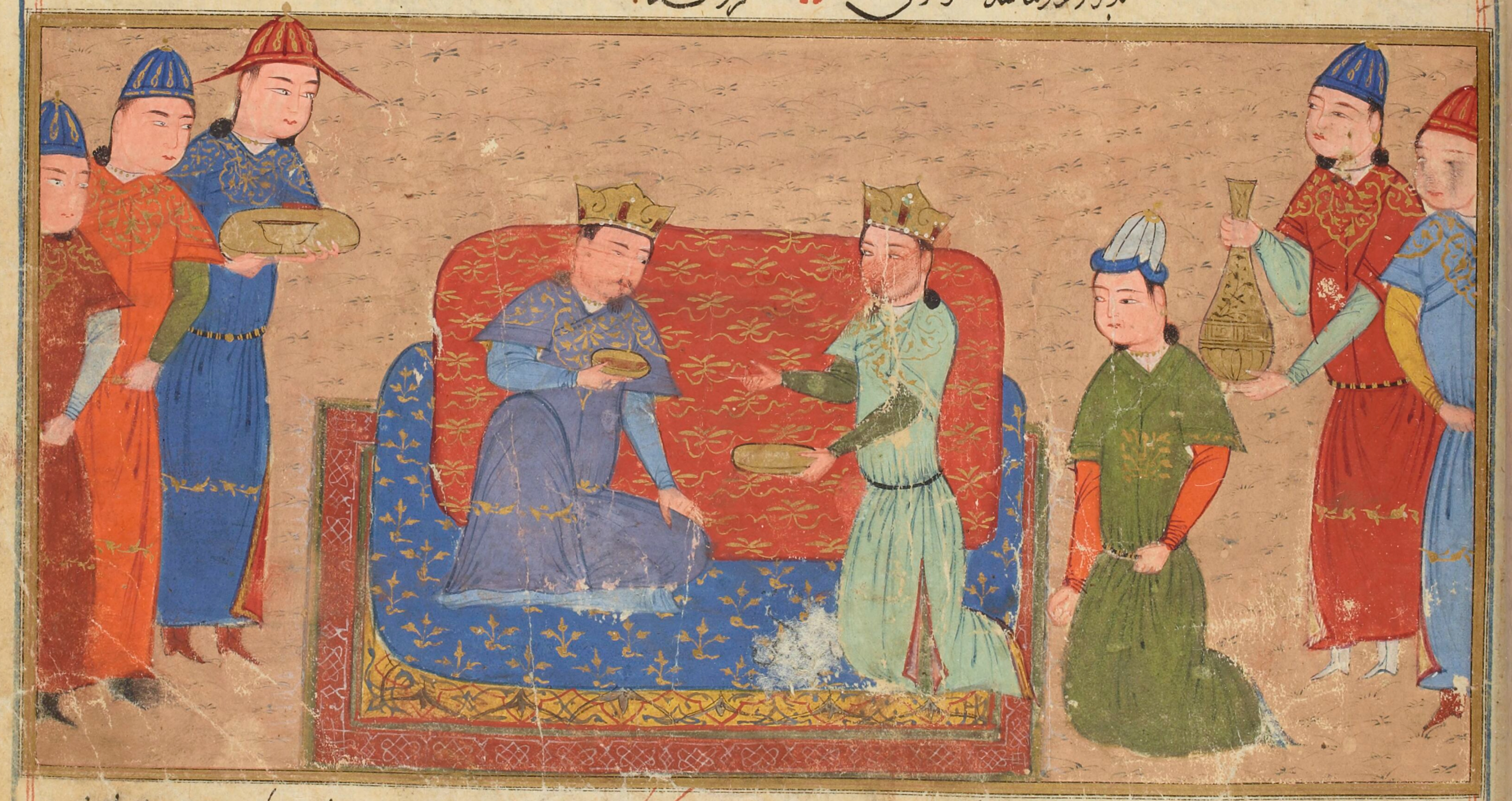
Temüjin and Toghrul, illustrated in a 15th-century Jami' al-tawarikh manuscript

Temüjin was born between 1155 and 1167 AD to Yesugei, a Mongol chieftain, and his Olkhonud wife Hö'elün. Yesugei died when Temüjin was nine and he, his mother, and six other siblings were all abandoned by their tribe. The family however survived and Temüjin began to collect a small group of companions, especially after he swore loyalty to his father's anda (lit. "blood brother"), the chieftain Toghrul of the central Kereit tribe. His ambitions were stymied by Jamukha, his own anda, whom he intermittently fought from the 1180s onwards. Although the Kereit were ostensibly the most powerful tribe on the Mongol steppe by 1201, the tribe's nobility began to fear that they too would soon be usurped by the rapidly rising Temüjin, who had become dominant in eastern Mongolia. These aristocrats were led by Toghrul's son Senggum, who was afraid for his own inheritance.

These fears would soon be realised. Aiming to secure control over the Kereit line of succession, Temüjin proposed that his eldest son Jochi be married to Toghrul's daughter Cha'ur Beki, promising one of his own daughters to Senggum's son in return for the establishment of quda (lit. "marriage alliance"). Senggum conclusively rejected this proposal: not only was his position as heir to the Kereit at risk, but he found the proposal disrespectful because of Jochi's possible illegitimacy. (Note: Jochi was born after his mother Börte was kidnapped and raped by members of the Merkit tribe. Although Genghis always treated him as a legitimate son, doubts concerning Jochi's paternity followed him throughout his life.) Senggum was supported in his position by the tribal aristocracy, which included Altan and Kuchar, two of Temüjin's relatives, and Jamukha, who urged immediate action against his old anda. Toghrul's position in the dispute is unclear—according to the Secret History of the Mongols, a 13th-century retelling of Temüjin's life and campaigns, he was torn between his close ties to Temüjin and his love for his son, only choosing to support the latter when presented with an ultimatum. On the other hand, according to the Jami al-tawarikh of Rashid al-Din and oral histories recounted by Marco Polo, Toghrul was already predisposed against Temüjin and reacted angrily to the marriage proposal. It is possible that Toghrul's mind was swayed by a merchant delegation from Central Asia containing representatives from the Qara Khitai and the Uighurs, whom Temüjin would probably exclude from the Silk Road trade structures were he to gain ascendancy; it is also likely that Temüjin's own ambitions were somewhat to blame for the rupture in relations.

In the end, Senggum's arguments prevailed over Toghrul. Desiring to avoid open conflict if possible, the Kereit leader devised a plan of deception: he informed Temüjin that he had decided to accept the proposed marriages and intended to hold a celebratory banquet. An unsuspecting Temüjin set off with a minimal guard to the feast, (Note: Rashid al-Din mentions two companions, whereas the Secret History of the Mongols counts ten.) where the conspirators had planned to ambush and kill him; warned of hostile rumours by his father's old retainer Münglig, he halted. Led by Senggum, the Kereit then took to the field in force, and Temüjin only escaped because two herdsmen named Badai and Kishlik overheard the plans and came to warn him. Decisively outnumbered, Temüjin was forced into headlong flight—he rode with his companions to the borders of Jin China, where he hoped to find reinforcements and, if necessary, seek sanctuary across the border. Even though he received some defectors from the Kereit force, including Kuildar of the Mankut and Jurchedei of the Uru'ud, Temüjin was decisively defeated at the Battle of Qalaqaljid Sands in early 1203. The defections proved crucial in allowing Temüjin to escape—Jurchedei wounded Senggum with an arrow, halting the Kereit attack—but Toghrul also chose not to pursue, reasoning that his enemy was out of the strategic picture.

== The Baljuna Covenant ==
Temüjin's forces had suffered severe losses during the withdrawal from the battle and several of his captains were missing. Despite the danger, he waited through the following night for his surviving troops to gather. Bo'orchu arrived at dawn, having lost his horse at Qalaqaljid, and he was shortly followed by Boroqul, who was tending to Ögedei, Temüjin's third son, who had suffered a serious neck injury. Temüjin then retreated, stopping only to bury Kuildar, who had been killed during the battle. His forces eventually reached a lake or river named Baljuna, a place of unknown location. The most likely location lies on the Kalka River, which Temüjin might have retreated along and which lies close to the Jin frontier in south-eastern Mongolia. Scholars have alternately identified it as a tributary of the River Ingoda, or as Lake Balzino in Buryatia.

At this juncture in mid-1203, Temüjin's force was very small, amounting to either 2,600 or 4,600 warriors. Biographies in the Yuán Shǐ, a 14th-century official history, exaggerate the exigent situation by stating Temüjin was accompanied by only nineteen followers, but this might well refer only to the company leaders. According to the Yuán Shǐ, the starving men killed a wild horse that fortuitously appeared, eating its flesh and using its by-products to safely drink the muddy water; their leader then swore an oath:

Temüjin, raising his hands towards the sky, swore thus: "If I finish 'the Great Work' then I shall share with you men the sweet and the bitter. If I break this word then let me be like this river, drunk up by others." Among officers and men there was none who was not moved to tears.

This retelling likely masks the historical events. The poetic Baljuna Covenant encapsulates the themes—a potent mixture of social equality and personal asceticism—Temüjin would emphasise to potential recruits. Temüjin in all probability spent a large portion of the summer attempting to recruit warriors to his cause: those he succeeded with included the Onggirat (the tribe of his wife Börte), the Ikires, and some of the Nirun Mongols. Other recruits included leaders of the Khitan tribe, who saw in Temüjin a route to revenge against the Jin, and the Muslim merchants Ja'far and Hasan, who exchanged a thousand sheep for guarantees of future security and favourable trade pacts. He even recruited members of Toghrul's Kereit tribe, such as Chinqai who became a prominent administrator under Ogedei.

Historians have emphasised the social, cultural, and religious heterogeneity of the Baljuna oath-takers. There were no Mongols, apart from Temüjin and his brother Qasar, in the traditional nineteen—they instead included Khitans, Tanguts, Keireits, Naimans, Central Asians, and possibly even South Asians, from a total of nine different clans. Swearing loyalty to Temüjin, a devout adherent of Tengrism, were three Muslims and several Christians and Buddhists. In transcending traditional avenues of community, the Baljuna Covenant was "a type of brotherhood [akin to] modern civic citizenship based upon personal choice and commitment", in the words of the historian Jack Weatherford.

== Aftermath and historiography ==
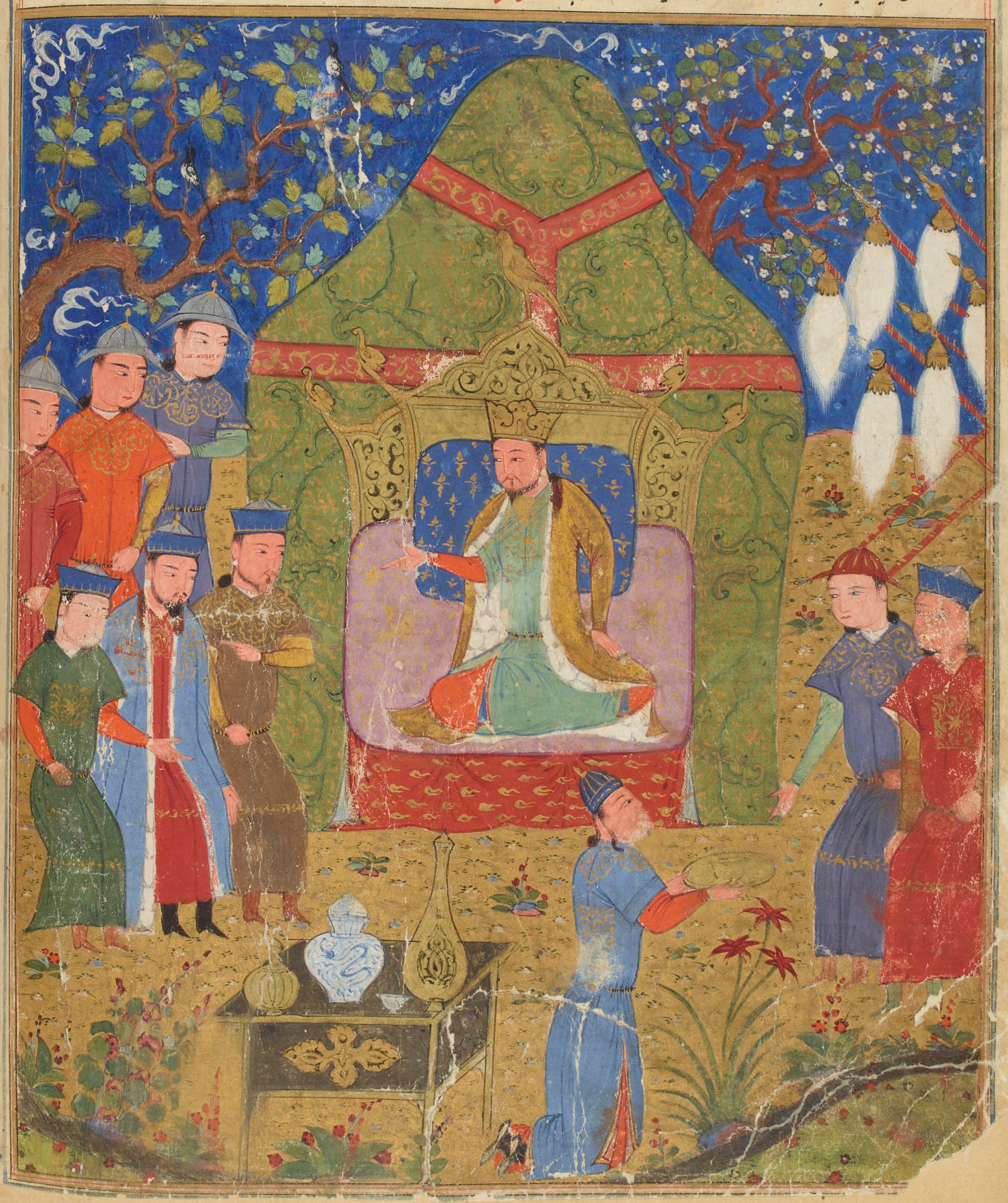
Temüjin being proclaimed as Genghis Khan at the kurultai of 1206, where he rewarded those who were loyal at Baljuna (depicted in a 15th-century Jami' al-tawarikh manuscript)

In late 1203, a revitalised Temüjin marshalled his forces and defeated the Kereit in a hard-fought three-day battle at the Jeje'er Heights on the lower Kherlen River. The fleeing Toghrul was killed by a Naiman sentry who did not recognise him; Senggum fled first to Tibet and then Kashgar, where he was later killed. Over the next three years, Temüjin defeated the Naimans and Merkits, uniting the Mongol steppe under one ruler. In 1206, he held a great kurultai (lit. "assembly") on the Onon River, at which he took the title "Genghis Khan" and rewarded those who brought him to power. These included the herdsmen Badai and Kishlik who had warned him of Toghrul's betrayal—they were honoured with the Kereit leader's palace tent, furnishings, and [bodyguard. The men who swore the Baljuna Covenant, who became known as Baljunatu (lit. "Baljuna men", or "Muddy Water Drinkers") were honoured with the highest titles and were remembered as late as the 1300s. Many took prominent positions in Genghis' Mongol Empire—these included Chinqai, the Muslim merchant and diplomat Ja'far Khoja, and Qaban, an Uriankhai whose son Subutai became one of the most formidable Mongol generals.

The incident of the Baljuna Covenant is omitted completely from the Secret History. This lacuna led sinologists to doubt the episode's historicity for nearly a century, from Palladius in the 1860s to E. H. Parker, the influential Paul Pelliot, Arthur Waley, and René Grousset in the mid-20th century. In 1955, Francis Woodman Cleaves published an essay repudiating this assumption; Cleaves's theory has now become general among historians, due to the abundance of other sources mentioning the Baljunatu. The erasure of the incident from the Secret History was probably because of the heterogeneity of the oath-takers—the author, suspicious of non-Mongols, may have decided to ignore the event which saw them elevated to Temüjin's inner circle.
