= Möge Khatun =

Princess of the Bakrin tribe and concubine of Genghis Khan

Möge Khatun Мөгэ хатан

Khatun of the Mongols
- Tenure: 1229–1241
- Born: 1190s
- Died: 1242; Karakorum, Mongol Empire
- Burial: Karakorum
- Spouses: Genghis Khan; Ögedei Khan
- Religion: Tengrism

Möge Khatun (Mongolian: Мөгэ хатан, died 1242), was a princess of the Bakrin tribe and concubine of Genghis Khan. After the Khan’s death, Möge became a wife of Genghis' son, Ögedei Khan. She was briefly regent in 1241.

According to the historian Juvayni, "she was given to Genghis Khan by a chief of the Bakrin tribe, and he loved her very much." Ögedei also favored her, and she accompanied him on hunting expeditions. In 1241, after the death of Ögedei Khan, power briefly passed into her hands. By the spring of 1242, however, Töregene Khatun had assumed complete power as regent with the support of Chagatai and her sons with the title Great Khatun and replaced the ministers of Ögödei with her own. Historian Timothy May has argued that Töregene waited until the death of Möge Khatun and Ögedei's first wife Boraqchin before revealing her true intentions with the regency.

Möge Khatun did not have any children.

== In popular culture ==
A fictionalized version of Möge Khatun features in the 2021 manga series A Witch's Life in Mongol, which was adapted into an anime in 2026.

== See also ==
- History of Mongolia
- Genghis Khan
- Ogedei Khan
