= Bo'orchu =

Close companion of Genghis Khan

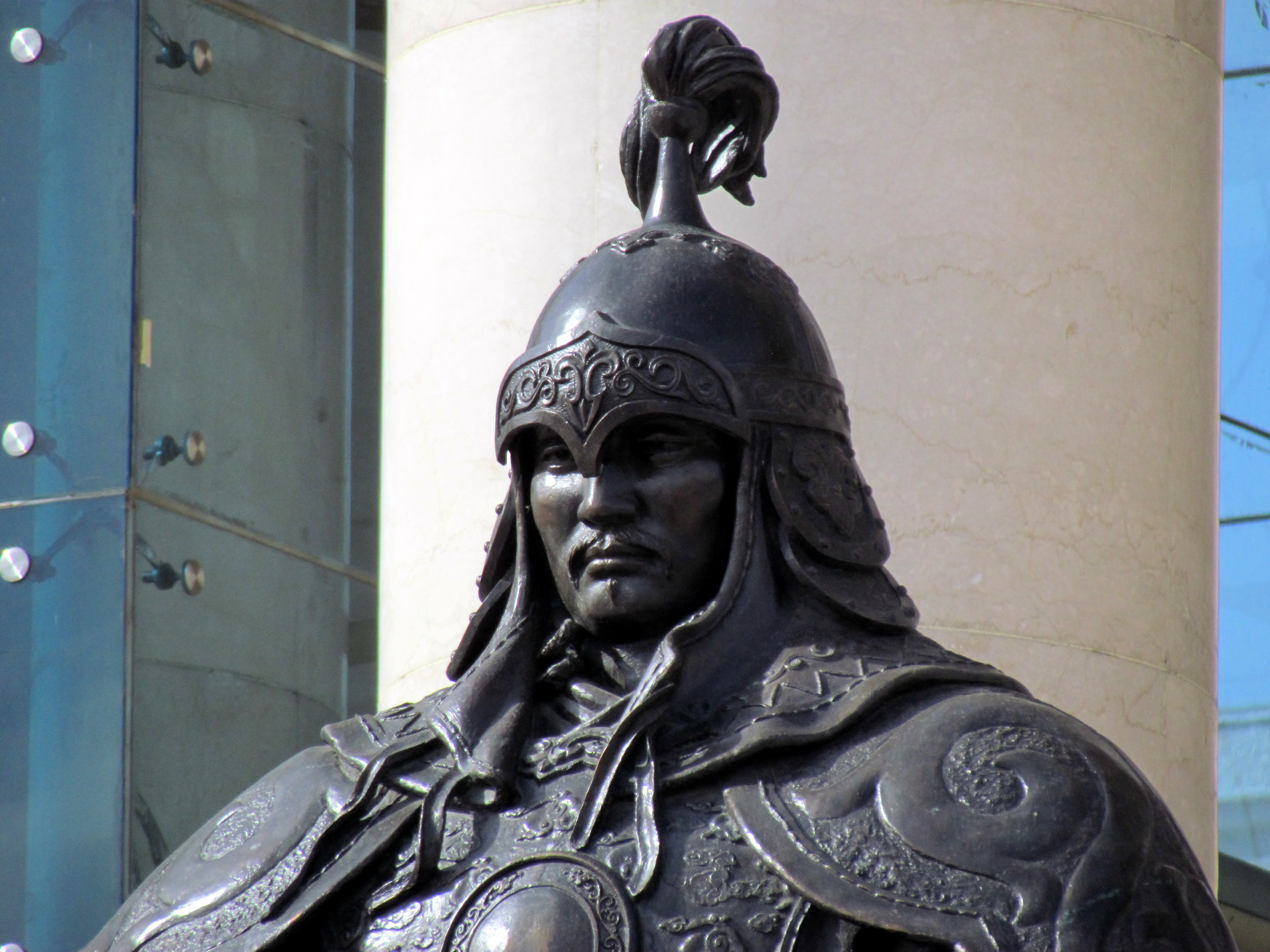
Modern statue of Bo'orchu in Sükhbaatar Square, Ulaanbaatar

Bo'orchu (Mongolian: Боорчи, Boorchi) was one of the first and most loyal of Genghis Khan's friends and allies. He first met Genghis Khan as a boy. At that time, Genghis Khan (then Temujin) was looking for his stolen horses. Bo'orchu helped him win back the horses, and returned with Temujin to his father, Nakhu Bayan, who scolded him, having feared he was dead. Later, Temujin sent Hasar to get Bo'orchu and bring him to Temujin's camp. Bo'orchu refused any reward for helping Temujin recover the stolen horses, but recognized his authority and attached to him as a nökör (i.e. "free companion"), leaving his own family.

After Temujin's wife, Börte, was abducted by the Merkits and he was forced to flee, Bo'orchu was sent to spy on the Merkits with Belgutei and Jelme. After Temujin took the titles Genghis Khan and Great Khan of the Mongols, Bo'orchu was made head of the Khan's followers along with Jelme.

When Genghis Khan was at Dalannemurges to fight the Tatars, heavy rain fell and Bo'orchu stood over the Khan with a felt sheet to shelter him. Genghis Khan later rewarded Bo'orchu for this deed, praising him for he only shifted his weight from one foot to the other once during the night. Bo'orchu was later shot off his horse during a battle against Jamukha in the Khalakhaljid Sands. He stole an enemy horse and returned the next day, helping to find the enemy position. Bo'orchu was one of the most trusted friends of Ögedei, Genghis Khan's son and the second ruler of the Mongol Empire.

In modern Mongolia, Bo'orchu is commemorated with a statue in front of the Government Palace in Sükhbaatar Square, Ulaanbaatar. His and Muqali's statues flank a larger statue of Genghis Khan.
