= Boroqul =

General and companion of Genghis Khan

Boroqul (Mongolian: Борохул, also known as Boroghul, Boro'ul, and Borokhula; c. 1162–1217) was one of the foremost generals of Temüjin (later Genghis Khan) during his rise to power. Raised as a foundling by Temüjin's mother Hoelun, he won great renown by saving the life of Temüjin's son and future heir Ögedei after the Battle of Khalakhaljid Sands in 1203.

In recognition of this and other achievements, Boroqul became a member of Genghis' inner council and one of his most trusted advisors alongside Bo'orchu and Muqali. Boroqul died on a campaign against the northern Tumed tribes in 1217, but his achievements meant his clan remained prominent leaders in the Mongol Empire for centuries.

== Life and career ==
Boroqul first appears in the historical record shortly after Temüjin's marriage to his wife Börte in around 1177 or 1178. The Secret History of the Mongols, a traditional Mongol account of Temüjin's rise to power, notes that Boroqul was originally from the Üüshin lineage of the Jurkin tribe and was raised by Temüjin's mother Hoelun as a foundling after being saved by Jebe, a leading Mongol general. Serving as Temüjin's nökor (personal companion; pl. nökod), Boroqul prospered under his new liege, soon becoming the highest-ranking nökor after Temüjin's great friend Bo'orchu.

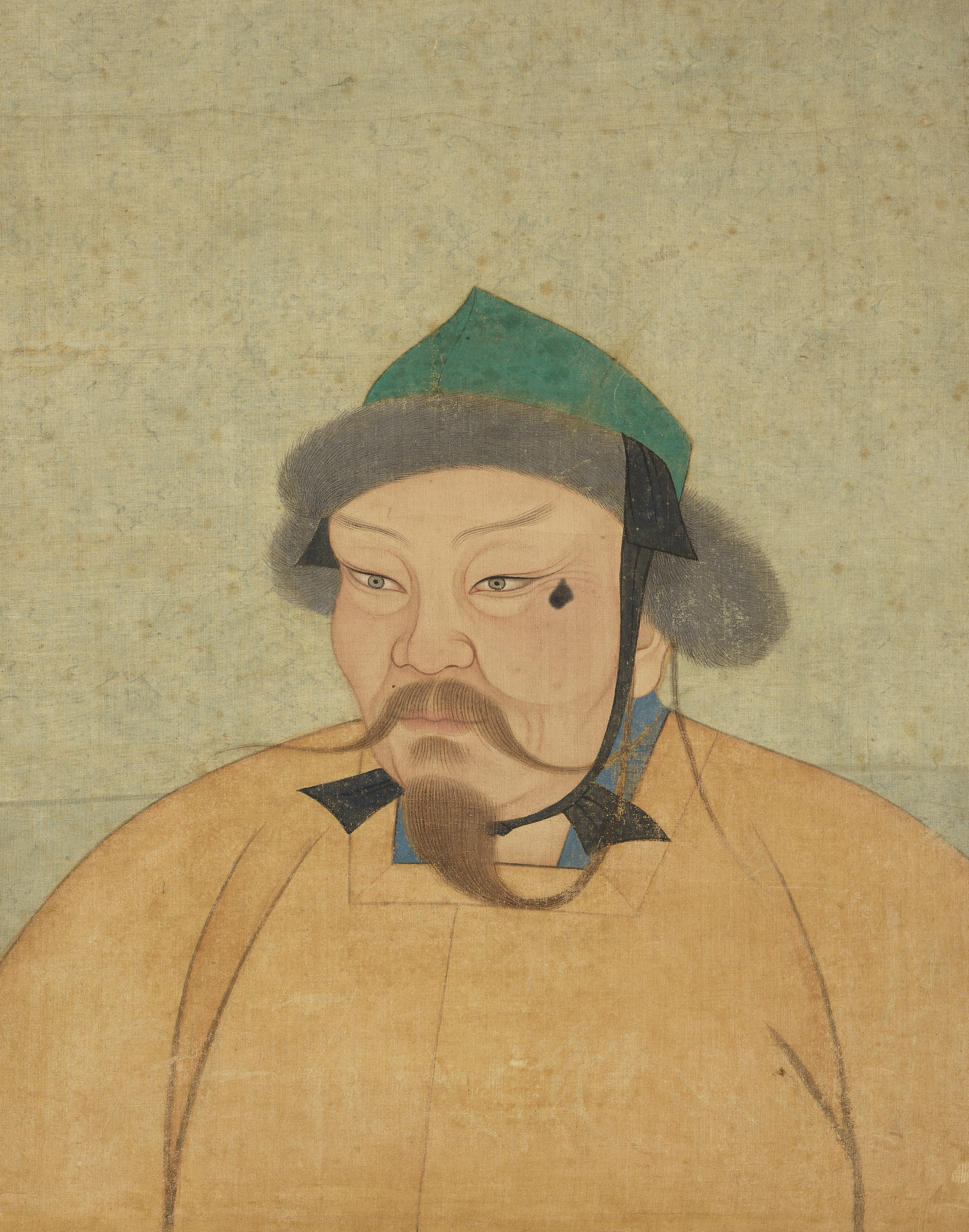
A Yuan dynasty portrait of Ögedei, whose life Boroqul saved after the Battle of Khalakhaljid Sands in 1203.

Although he led troops in many actions during his liege's rise to power, the deed which won Boroqul the most acclaim occurred shortly after the Battle of Khalakhaljid Sands in 1203. Having been betrayed by his ally Toghrul, Temüjin suffered a decisive loss on the Khalakhaljid Sands and was forced to withdraw. During the battle, his seventeen year-old son Ögedei had been badly wounded by an arrow in the neck; Boroqul saved Ögedei's life by continuously sucking clotted blood from the wound during the night ride to Temüjin's camp. When they arrived shortly after Bo'orchu, the Secret History notes, "blood [was] trickling from the corners of [Boroqul's] mouth." According to the Secret History, his wife Altani also gained renown for saving Temüjin's youngest son Tolui from a Tatar kidnapping attempt, although another account recounts that Tolui was saved by his adopted brother Shigi Qutuqu and a nearby Mongol sheepdog.

As a result of these and other actions, Boroqul was honoured greatly at the kurultai Temüjin called in May 1206. He received a selection of rewards and exemptions, bettered only by those given Bo'orchu and Muqali, which included exemptions from the death penalty, and positions including cupbearer and high steward. Rashid al-Din Hamadani recorded in his Jami' al-tawarikh that Boroqul and Bo'orchu were told that Temüjin, now entitled Genghis Khan, held them in such respect that he would never issue them with specific military orders, unlike other generals such as Muqali, Jebe, and Subutai. The two also shared titular command of the keshig, the Mongol imperial guard, with Muqali and Chilaun. Genghis named these four as his "steeds", and together with his "hounds" (Subutai, Jebe, Jelme, and Khubilai Noyon) and the fellow foundling Shigi Qutuqu, they formed the khan's "paladins", or inner council. Boroqul would command the 38,000 troops of the Mongol right wing with Bo'orchu, and as the khan's most trusted advisors, they and Muqali played a key role in advocating for Genghis' brother Qasar during his dispute with the shaman Kokochu.

In 1217, Boroqul set out to command an expedition against the northern Tumed tribes, despite having a strong premonition of his impending death if he went. He achieved initial successes against the tribes, who had captured the Mongol general Qutuqa Beki, but was ambushed and killed away from the main force by Tumed scouts. Incensed at the news of his companion's death, Genghis made preparations to personally lead the campaign, but was dissuaded from this course by Muqali and Bo'orchu; he instead sent his eldest son Jochi, accompanied by the general Dorbei Doqshin, who together managed to subjugate the Tumed during a gruelling winter campaign in 1217–18. A hundred Tumeds were sacrificed in vengeance for Boroqul's death.

Genghis took responsibility for the welfare of Boroqul's children, awarding them honours and taking an interest in their careers; the Üüshin clan to which he belonged became a powerful aristocratic family in the Mongol Empire. His family continued to receive the titular command of the keshig under Kublai Khan; Öchicher, one of Boroqul's descendants, managed to amass great personal wealth in this position in the late 13th and early 14th centuries.
