= A Witch's Life in Mongol =

Japanese manga series

- First tankōbon volume cover, featuring Sitara

天幕のジャードゥーガル (Tenmaku no Jādūgaru)
- Genre: Historical
- Manga
- Written by: Tomato Soup
- Published by: Akita Shoten
- English publisher: NA: Yen Press
- Imprint: Princess Comics Bonita
- Magazine: Souffle; Mystery Bonita; (March 6, 2025 – present)
- Original run: September 25, 2021 – present
- Volumes: 6
- Anime television series

Jaadugar: A Witch in Mongolia
- Directed by: Naoko Yamada (chief); Abel Góngora
- Written by: Kanichi Katou
- Music by: Kōshirō Hino
- Studio: Science Saru
- Licensed by: Crunchyroll: SEA: Plus Media Networks Asia
- Original network: ANN (TV Asahi), BS Asahi, AT-X, TV Asahi Channel 1, Animax
- Original run: July 4, 2026 – September 12, 2026
- Episodes: 12
- icon

A Witch's Life in Mongol (Japanese: 天幕のジャードゥーガル, Hepburn: Tenmaku no Jādūgaru; lit. 'Jaadugar of the Tent') is a Japanese manga series written and illustrated by Tomato Soup. It began serialization on Akita Shoten's Souffle website in September 2021, and in parallel alongside Mystery Bonita in March 2025. An anime television series adaptation produced by Science Saru, titled Jaadugar: A Witch in Mongolia, aired from July to September 2026.

== Plot ==
In the early 13th century, in the city of Tus, Khwarazmian Empire, Sitara is sold as a slave to a family of scholars. Although she initially tries to run away, the family teaches her the importance of knowledge and she ends up working and studying in their home.

After the heir to the family leaves for Nishapur to further his studies, the Mongols invade Tus. Sitara is captured by Tolui's army and her master is killed while protecting her. After being taken to Mongolia, she takes on the name Fatima and begins to plot her revenge on the Mongols.

== Characters ==
Sitara (シタラ, Shitara) / Fatima (ファーティマ, Fātima)
Voiced by: Akira Sekine (Japanese); Cristina Vee (English)
Sitara is the main protagonist. Sitara was orphaned and sold as a slave for a rich but kind family. After her master Fatima and most other members of the household are killed during the Mongol invasion, and learning that Prince Tolui came after a certain book as a wish from his wife Princess Sorghaghtani, Sitara decides to take on the name Fatima and works as high ranking servant for Sorghaghtani in order to get the book back and get revenge on the Mongols by using her knowledge and her social manipulation skills.
Fatima (ファーティマ, Fātima)
Voiced by: Houko Kuwashima (Japanese); Marwa Elda (English)
A widow of a scholar family in Tus. She took Sitara from a slave trader and raised her as if she were her own daughter. She is killed protecting Sitara during the Mongol invasion.
Muhammad (ムハンマド, Muhanmado)
Voiced by: Jun Saitō (Japanese); Yussef Benelbar (English)
Fatima's son, a boy with a passion for learning. He taught Sitara the importance of knowledge. Although he went missing during the Mongol invasion and never saw Sitara again, readers are told that he survived and later became a renowned scholar.
Tolui (トルイ, Torui)
Voiced by: Ryōta Suzuki (Japanese); Alex Mai (English)
The fourth prince. He invaded Sitara's homeland and carried her off to Mongolia. He is a skilled warrior, but has no interest in scholarship. Tolui has two sons named Hulegu and Kublai. In 1232, when Ögedei got sick from poisoning like Boraqchin and during a ritual to place the sickness in a water of cup and that a blood relative have to drink it, Tolui chooses himself to drink it to save Ögedei (not knowing this is all part of Boraqchin's plan), Tolui soon perished by it.
Shira (シラ)
Voiced by: Miyu Irino (Japanese); Abi Kumar (English)
A boy from Samarkand. After being captured by the Mongols, he serves them as an interpreter in order to survive.
Töregene (ドレゲネ, Doregene)
Voiced by: Ami Koshimizu (Japanese); Michelle Rojas (English)
The sixth wife of Ögedei. 25 years ago Töregene lived peacefully in the nation Naiman tribe before she unknowingly is sent to reinforce the alliance with the Merkit tribe by marriage to the old chieftain Dayir. Töregene tries to return to Naiman tribe, but begins to feel happiness in her new life with Dayir and his daughter Khulan. But one day Töregene learns that after Genghis Khan became their leader the Mongols have continued to rob the Merkits and why strengthening of the alliance was to enable them to overcome the Mongols. Merkits give Khulan as an offering to Genghis Khan and they were spared. Dayir and the men secretly organize a rebellion at the Mongols. Töregene went to Dayir only to see her husband have been killed by Ögedei. Töregene is even more shocked that Khulan did not any sadness towards her own father but it was to hide her sad and powerless she has felt, afterwards Töregene was made as Ögedei's wife and allowed to live and gave birth to his children as well, with one of them named Güyük. Töregene has been waiting for a storm that ravage the Mongol Empire, she saw Sitara and many years later she saves her, Töregene tells Sitara her story and discovers they both have hatred for the Mongol's actions and since the empire has become fragile they are going together to get the revenge over the Mongol empire.
Ögedei (オゴタイ, Ogotai)
Voiced by: Hiro Shimono (Japanese); Ethan Marshall (English)
The third prince. He possessed magnanimity and foresight, and in 1229 was appointed the second emperor by his father, Genghis Khan who died in 1227. Ögedei has many wives, but one of his wives Töregene hates Ögedei for killing her husband Dayir and the Mongols actions. In 1232, Ögedei is struck with same illness as Boraqchin which turns out he got poisoned with same stuff Boraqchin, by using Sitara's jada stone and performing a ritual to place the illness in a cup of water, it is told by the performers that only a relative have to take sacrifice and Tolui chooses himself to drink it.
Chagatai (チャガタイ)
Voiced by: Daisuke Namikawa (Japanese); Mauricio Ortiz-Segura (English)
The second prince.
Jochi (ジュチ, Juchi)
Voiced by: Kenji Nojima (Japanese); Charles Nguyen (English)
The first prince. He died from a serious illness in 1225. Jochi has two sons named Orda and Batu.
Sorghaghtani (ソルコクタニ, Sorukokutani)
Voiced by: Misaki Kuno (Japanese); Emi Lo (English)
Sorghaghtani is the wife of Prince Tolui. Sorghaghtani desired a book that will help the Mongols rule the world and make her and Tolui an empress and emperor of the Mongols, but Sorghaghtani is ignorant of the suffering her wish has caused towards Sitara and others. Sorghaghtani made Sitara as her tutor of the book and high ranking servant, not knowing Sitara secretly plans to take the book and get revenge on her and the Mongols. In 1229, after Ögedei became the new Khan, Sorghaghtani tells Sitara to spy on Chagatai but ends up spying on Ögedei. In 1232, Sorghaghtani along with Tolui is informed of Ögedei's sickness and Tolui drinks up the tainted water from Ögedei, after Tolui's death Sorghaghtani loses both the chance for the throne and the stability of the House of Tolui. Due to this Sitara no longer works for Sorghaghtani.
Möge (モゲ, Moge)
Voiced by: Ayaka Asai (Japanese); Ezra Vervin (English)
The fourth wife of Ögedei. Möge was once a concubine to Genghis Khan, Ögedei ended up inheriting her as a wife.
Kirgistani (キルギスタニ, Kirugisutani)
Voiced by: Mayumi Shintani (Japanese); Celeste Perez (English)
The third wife of Ögedei. Kirgistani has one son named Godan.
Dayir (ダイル, Dairu)
Voiced by: Akira Ishida (Japanese); Ernesto Jason Liebrecht (English)
Khulan (クラン, Kuran)
Voiced by: Inori Minase (Japanese); Reshel Mae (English)
Qultuqan (クルトガン, Kurutogan)
Voiced by: Shōya Chiba (Japanese); Nicolas Roye (English)
Boraqchin (ボラクチン, Borakuchin)
Voiced by: Kujira (Japanese); Anastasia Muñoz (English)
The first wife of Ögedei and the empress. Boraqchin was once a second wife to Genghis Khan, Ögedei ended up inheriting her as a wife. In 1232, after being informed by Sitara about Sorghaghtani desire to make herself and Tolui the rulers (which informing her is part of Sitara and Töregene's revenge on the Mongol Empire), Boraqchin talks to Töregene and comes with a plan in to poison Ögedei and make Tolui drink the tainted water from Ögedei, in order to get rid of Tolui. Boraqchin gives Sitara the book back from Sorghaghtani after learning it from Töregene and thanking her for the problem with the House of Tolui, Boraqchin tells Sitara to work for her from now on.

== Production ==
Tomato Soup originally had Töregene Khatun as the protagonist, though she felt that Fatima would be better to represent the size of the Mongol Empire. She also felt Fatima would be more interesting to write. Regarding the illustrations, Tomato Soup felt that medieval manuscripts tend to have "unrealistic" styles, so she tried to imitate that style.

== Media ==
=== Manga ===
Written and illustrated by Tomato Soup, A Witch's Life in Mongol began serialization on Akita Shoten's Souffle website on September 25, 2021, alongside a parallel serialization in the Mystery Bonita magazine on March 6, 2025, with individual chapters collected in six tankōbon volumes as of July 2026. On March 24, 2025, the series moved to a bimonthly status until Summer 2025, and entered into a hiatus due to Soup's maternity leave.

At New York Comic Con 2024, Yen Press announced that they licensed the series for English publication.

==== Volumes ====
No.	Original release date	Original ISBN	English release date	English ISBN
1	August 16, 2022	978-4-253-26446-4	May 27, 2025	979-8-8554-1421-9
2	February 16, 2023	978-4-253-26447-1	November 25, 2025	979-8-8554-1423-3
3	September 14, 2023	978-4-253-26448-8	July 28, 2026	979-8-8554-1425-7
4	August 16, 2024	978-4-253-26449-5	October 27, 2026	979-8-8554-2583-3
5	April 16, 2025	978-4-253-26450-1	—	—
6	July 15, 2026	978-4-253-01818-0	—	—

=== Anime ===
An anime television series adaptation, titled Jaadugar: A Witch in Mongolia, was announced on April 14, 2025. It is produced by Science Saru and directed by Abel Góngora, with Naoko Yamada serving as chief director, Kanichi Katou handling series composition, Kenichi Yoshida designing the characters and serving as chief animator, and Kōshirō Hino composing the music. The series aired from July 4 to September 12, 2026, on the IMAnimation programming block on TV Asahi and its affiliates, as well as other networks. The opening theme song is "Stella", performed by Sekai no Owari, while the ending theme song is "Hoshi" (星; Star), performed by Queen Bee. Crunchyroll is streaming the series. Plus Media Networks Asia licensed the series in Southeast Asia for broadcast on Aniplus Asia.

==== Episodes ====
No.	Title	Directed by	Written by	Storyboarded by	Original release date
1	"All That Is in the Heavens and All That Is in the Earth"; Transliteration: "Ten ni Aru Mono, Chi ni Aru Mono" (Japanese: 天にあるもの 地にあるもの)	Abel Gongora	Kanichi Katō	Abel Gongora	July 4, 2026 (Note: Episodes 1 and 2 premiered back-to-back.)
In Tus, a Muslim city in the east of Persia, little Sitara is a slave in a scholarly household where she is encouraged to study and learn. Menial labor isn't her forte. Muhammad, the young man of the house, demonstrates how ignorance causes fear, and knowledge banishes it. At the end of the episode, the Mongols capture the city.
2	"The Roses That Bloom in Safar"; Transliteration: "Safaru ni Saku Bara" (Japanese: サファルに咲く薔薇)	Naoko Yamada & Takuya Fujikura	Kanichi Katō	Naoko Yamada	July 4, 2026
The Mongols steal the family's copy of Euclid's Elements, kill Sitara's mistress, sack the city, and take Sitara and the other survivors as slaves. More of Sitara's people are killed as their captors march them overland. Sitara despairs, but Shira, the boy who interpreted Persian for the invaders, motivates her to live and to focus on recovering the stolen book.
3	"An Undying Flame"; Transliteration: "Keshienu Honō" (Japanese: 消しえぬ炎)	Yujiro Abe	Toshiaki Satō	Yujiro Abe	July 11, 2026
Sitara hates the Mongols, but she elects to work within her current constraints. With Shira's aid, she takes the classier sounding name Fatima and gains an audience with Tolui, the general who sacked her city. She will teach the Elements to Tolui's wife, Princess Sorghaghtani. Enroute to Mongolia, she observes Töregene, a noblewoman who considers her Mongol husband an enemy. Fatima impresses the men with her observations of a solar eclipse and her wisdom regarding the futility of seeking immortality.
4	"Otchigin"; Transliteration: "Otchigin" (Japanese: 炉の主(オッチギン))	Tomohisa Shimoyama	Mio Inoue	Tomohisa Shimoyama	July 18, 2026
Fatima at last meets Princess Sorghaghtani, who wanted the Elements in order to bring advanced Western knowledge to her people. Fatima is furious that Sorghaghtani remains ignorant of the suffering her wish has caused. Seasons pass, then years. Fatima and her people adapt to Mongol life. Sorghaghtani keeps ownership of the book. Genghis Khan perishes. Tolui becomes regent until his brother Ögedei is elected Khan. Fatima finds a strange stone in an animal's entrails. Sorghaghtani seeks Fatima's services as a spy.
5	"A Snake Shows Its Colors, Man Hides His Colors"; Transliteration: "Hebi no Madara wa Sotogawa ni Hito no Madara wa Uchigawa ni" (Japanese: 蛇のまだらは外側に 人のまだらは内側に)	Norikazu Ishigōoka	Kanichi Katō	Shinsaku Sasaki	July 25, 2026
Anticipating rivalry among the top leadership, Sorghaghtani wants Fatima to monitor Chagatai, brother of Ögedei and Tolui. Fatima poses as a lost slave. She encounters a grown Shira and meets other Persian slaves who are happy with their new lives. Fatima accidentally reveals her bezoar stone. She is brought before an angry Töregene as a thief, but Fatima's stone is not the missing one. That night, Fatima is confronted by Ögedei's wives Kirgistani and Möge, Ögedei himself, and Chagatai. Fatima claims to be Töregene's property. Töregene plays along with the deception and offers to share her story with Fatima.
6	"The Mergen People"; Transliteration: "Merugen no Tami" (Japanese: メルゲンの民)	Kōtarō Matsunaga	Toshiaki Satō	Masashi Andō	August 1, 2026
Young Töregene of the Naiman tribe is offered as a political gift to Dayir, the elderly leader of the Merkit (also called Mergen) tribe. Her new husband ignores her, but she bonds with his daughter Khulan. Threatened by Temüjin, the future Ghengis Khan, the tribe surrenders, offering Khulan, Töregene, and the other maidens to the Mongols. The men mount a suicidal resistance. Töregene weds Ögedei and bears his children, but longs for the Mongols' downfall. She and Fatima bond over their shared experience and plot to "summon a storm."
7	"Brothers"; Transliteration: "Kyōdai" (Japanese: 兄弟)	Yujiro Abe	Mio Inoue	Yujiro Abe & Nicholas McKergow	August 9, 2026 (Note: This episode aired at midnight JST, 30 minutes after the regular air time on ANN.)
Ögedei, Chagatai, and Tolui jockey for power and test each others' characters with symbolic actions. Töregene and Fatima share their pasts and plot to support Tolui's plan to attack a neighboring nation. Töregene attends a kurultai. Möge brings a report of the kurultai to ailing Khatun Boraqchin. They foresee that Tolui's military success will bring him enough power—and resentment—to fracture the Empire. Töregene and Fatima reach the same conclusion. Möge is suspicious of Fatima, but as the two talk their rapport improves. Möge's wayward earrings pass through many hands before returning, proving that the Empire is functioning as it should.
8	"Great Khatun Boraqchin"; Transliteration: "Dai Katun Borakuchin" (Japanese: 大カトゥン ボラクチン)	Asami Murakoshi	Toshiaki Satō	Asami Murakoshi	August 16, 2026
Fatima discovers a book of alchemy. Möge wonders whether it might contain a recipe for an "al-iksir" that could cure Boraqchin. Fatima traces Boraqchin's ailment to her consumption of rahj al-gar for immortality. When she stops taking it, her condition improves—and her trust in Fatima increases. The military campaign against the neighboring Jin people begins. Enroute to the theater, Tolui defeats the Southern Song as well. Fatima reveals to Boraqchin that she serves Sorghaghtani, who may have high ambitions for her husband. Boraqchin summons Töregene for a private audience.
9	"Tengri"; Transliteration: "Tenguri" (Japanese: 天(テングリ))	Kōtarō Matsunaga	Mio Inoue	Kōtarō Matsunaga	August 23, 2026
Tolui prepares to engage the much larger Jin army. A ceremony with a bezoar brings a mighty blizzard. It weakens the Jin and Tolui wipes them out. Töregene distances herself from Fatima and embraces Ögedei. Ögedei falls ill from rahj al-gar poisoning. Suspicion falls on Fatima, then Töregene. Fatima gives up her bezoar to be Ögedei's antidote. An exorcism is performed to purge the "curse" from Ögedei. Tolui offers to be the necessary sacrifice.
10	"Wisdom"; Transliteration: "Chie" (Japanese: 知恵)	Kenji Maeba	Toshiaki Satō	Kenji Maeba	August 29, 2026
In a vision, Tolui rescues Ögedei from the spirit world. Ögedei survives but Tolui perishes. In gratitude for Fatima's aid in saving Ögedei, Boraqchin presents Fatima with the Elements and introduces her to Sorghaghtani's massive library. Boraqchin proclaims that wisdom will lead the Empire, and Fatima can be part of it. Fatima reflects on the events that brought her to this point. Boraqchin cautions Fatima not to speak of Töregene. Sorghaghtani mourns and seems to accept the diminishment of her House. Fatima enlists Shira's aid to find Töregene. They find Töregene's eldest son Güyük, who's fearful of strangers.
11	"An Ungraceful Stone"; Transliteration: "Bukiyō na Ishi" (Japanese: 不器用な石)	Junya Iwake	Kanichi Katō	Ryota Aikei, Naoko Yamada & Abel Gongora	September 5, 2026
Boraqchin recalls her first encounter with rahj al-gar, presented as a stone called sandarac. She becomes fascinated with its properties. Among other things, it decomposes to arsenic. Fatima pleads with Güyük for information about Töregene. They are interrupted by a messenger who says that Töregene will be freed and Güyük will marry Sorghaghtani. We learn that Ögedei's poisoning and Tolui's death were part of Boraqchin's plot. Fatima informs Sorghaghtani of the marriage. She meekly accepts. But as the wedding plans advance, she regains her spirit and refuses it.
12	"The Steppe, Ever Unchanging"; Transliteration: "Itsumo to Kawaranai Sōgen" (Japanese: いつもと変わらない草原)	Ryōsuke Nakamura & China	Kanichi Katō	China	September 12, 2026
Sorghagtani's refusal to marry upsets Boraqchin's plans, but Ögedei is satisfied with the situation. He also wishes to protect Töregene. Fatima and Shira race to the territory of General Ilüge to find Töregene. Töregene regrets her unknowing role in Boraqchin's plot. Güyük and Ögedei arrive. Güyük offers to take Töregene to his distant territory, where she will be safe—and removed from Imperial politics. Ögedei and Fatima debate the cause of the movement of the heavens. The Quran and animist spirits each provide explanations. Ögedei promises to remake the Empire in a way that will please Fatima and Töregene, but neither will abandon their vendetta against it. After the end credits a short coda shows the turning of the seasons, Sorghaghtani's apparent acceptance and dissemination of Christianity, and Fatima and Töregene's return to the Imperial court. Narration speaks of the formal annexation of Persia, the fallout of which will shake the Empire to its core.

== Reception ==
By August 2026, the manga had over one million copies in circulation. Yuka Furukawa of Da Vinci praised the setting and characters, particularly the villains, which Furukawa felt were realistic. Kazushi Shimada of Real Sound praised the story, particularly recommending it to fans of Hitoshi Iwaaki's Historié and Uoto's Orb: On the Movements of the Earth.

The series was nominated for the 16th Manga Taishō in 2023. It was also nominated for the 17th Manga Taishō in 2024. In the 2023 edition of the Kono Manga ga Sugoi! guidebook's list of the top manga for female readers, the series ranked first. In the 2024 edition's list, the series ranked 11th. It was nominated at the Japan Society and Anime NYC's second American Manga Awards for Best New Manga in 2025. It won the grand prize in the Comic Division at the 55th Japan Cartoonists Association Awards in 2026.

=== Anime ===
Rayan Sayyed of IGN India rated the first 2 episodes 9/10, and praised the series' visuals. A review of the first few episodes in Polygon called the series a "must-watch for anyone who appreciates a culturally robust tale rooted in real history". Positive reviews were also posted in The Hindu and Al Jazeera Arabic.
