= The Delicious Adventures of Dampier =

Japanese manga series

- First tankōbon volume cover

ダンピアのおいしい冒険 (Danpia no Oishii Bōken)
- Genre: Adventure, cooking
- Manga
- Written by: Tomato Soup
- Published by: East Press
- Magazine: Matogrosso
- Original run: April 21, 2019 – June 29, 2023
- Volumes: 6

The Delicious Adventures of Dampier (ダンピアのおいしい冒険, Danpia no Oishii Bōken) is a Japanese manga series written and illustrated by Tomato Soup. It was serialized on East Press' Matogrosso website from April 2019 to June 2023, with its chapters compiled into six volumes.

== Synopsis ==
The series is centered around a fictional portrayal of William Dampier, a 17th century English privateer. The series focuses on Dampier's travels as he discovers cultures, nature, and food unfamiliar to him.

== Publication ==
Written and illustrated by Tomato Soup, The Delicious Adventures of Dampier was serialized on East Press' Matogrosso website from April 21, 2019 to June 29, 2023. Its chapters were compiled into six tankōbon volumes released between August 7, 2020, and January 18, 2024.

No.	Release date	ISBN
1	August 7, 2020	978-4-7816-1896-8
2	December 14, 2020	978-4-7816-1936-1
3	July 17, 2021	978-4-7816-1992-7
4	May 12, 2022	978-4-7816-2069-5
5	April 12, 2023	978-4-7816-2169-2
6	January 18, 2024	978-4-7816-2248-4

== Reception ==
The series was ranked 4th at the 2020 Web Manga General Election poll. The series ranked twentieth in Freestyle magazine's "The Best 2021 Kono Manga wo Yome!" ranking in 2020. It was also ranked 6th in Takarajimasha's Kono Manga ga Sugoi! guidebook list for best manga for male readers in 2021.
