= Tomato Soup (manga artist) =

Japanese manga artist

- Born: Kanra, Gunma, Japan
- Area: Manga artist
- Notable works: The Delicious Adventures of Dampier; A Witch's Life in Mongol; Disloyal Retainer Smbat

Tomato Soup (Japanese: トマトスープ) is a Japanese manga artist. She is best known for creating historical manga based on world history from the Middle Ages to the early modern period. In 2026, she won the Grand Prize in the Comics Category of the 55th Japan Cartoonists Association Award for A Witch's Life in Mongol.

== Career ==
She was born in Kanra, Gunma Prefecture. She graduated from Tama Art University, where she majored in copperplate engraving.

Her pen name derives from the fact that she happened to use an empty can of tomato soup as a pen holder.

Around 2013, while still a student, she began working as a dōjin creator in the "historical fiction" genre online.

In 2019, after working as a salaried employee, she made her professional debut with The Delicious Adventures of Dampier after pitching to a publisher.

== Style ==
The Delicious Adventures of Dampier is set in the 17th century and features William Dampier of England. A Witch's Life in Mongol is set in the 13th century and features Fatima of the Mongol Empire. Disloyal Retainer Smbat is set in the 13th century and depicts the Mongol invasion of Georgia.

She conducts her own historical research, referencing academic papers obtained from the National Diet Library, as well as English-language literature and materials imported from overseas. She also visits institutions such as the Middle Eastern Culture Center and the Japan-Mongolia National Museum as part of offline meetings with fellow dōjin creators. In her commercial works, she not only depicts history but also incorporates universal themes.

By deliberately depicting historical scenes, which often involve cruelty, with deformed characters of 4–5 heads in height, she neutralizes the brutality while enhancing the emotional impact.

She has been influenced by Ryoko Kui's Delicious in Dungeon, Shigeru Mizuki, and the printmaker Tomoaki Hamada.

== Works ==
=== Manga ===
- The Delicious Adventures of Dampier (Japanese: ダンピアのおいしい冒険, Hepburn: Danpia no Oishii Bōken), East Press, 6 volumes total (serialized in Matogrosso from April 2019 to June 2023)
- A Witch's Life in Mongol (Japanese: 天幕のジャードゥーガル, Hepburn: Tenmaku no Jādūgaru; lit. 'Jaadugar of the Tent'), Akita Shoten (Bonita Comics), 6 volumes currently published in Japan (serialized in Souffle since September 25, 2021)
- Disloyal Retainer Smbat (Japanese: 奸臣スムバト, Hepburn: Kanshin Sumubato), Shinshokan (Wings Comics), 1 volume currently published (serialized in WINGS since August 2023)

1. Released December 26, 2024, ISBN 978-4-403-62385-1

=== Other ===
- Rusudan of the Setting Sun (Japanese: 斜陽の国のルスダン, Hepburn: Shiyayō no Kuni no Rusudan) (written by Akira Namiki, Shinkai-sha FICTIONS, 2022) – Illustrations. Originally published as a dōjinshi by Copper Kettle in 2016.

== Awards ==
- The Delicious Adventures of Dampier: Ranked 6th in the "Otoko" (Men's) category of Kono Manga ga Sugoi! 2021
- A Witch's Life in Mongol: Ranked 1st in the "Onna" (Women's) category of Kono Manga ga Sugoi! 2023; Ranked 5th in the Manga Taishō 2023
- A Witch's Life in Mongol: Grand Prize in the Comics Category of the 55th Japan Cartoonists Association Award
