= Khulan Khatun =

Wife and empress of Genghis Khan, second only to Börte

Khulan (Mongolian: ᠬᠤᠯᠠᠨ, Хулан; Chinese: 忽蘭; pinyin: Hūlán; c. 1164 – c. 1215) (also called Qulan) was an empress consort of Genghis Khan and head of the second Court of Genghis Khan. Her status in the Mongol Empire was second only to Grand Empress Börte.

== Biography ==
Khulan was a daughter of Dayir-Usun, Uvas Merkit chief. She was offered to Genghis Khan as a gift after the chief's surrender. Genghis Khan was enamored with Khulan and following his coronation as Khan, installed her as an empress. She had a son, Gelejian, with Genghis Khan, and Gelejian's status was second only to Börte's four sons as he grew up.

== As Genghis Khan's wife ==
Like his other wives, Khulan had her own ordo, or court. She was given the Khentii Mountains as her territory.

Genghis Khan was very fond of Abika Khulan, and most of the time she was the only empress accompanying him on many campaigns, notably the western campaign against the Khwarezmid Empire. She continued to travel with Genghis Khan until she died during one of Genghis Khan's campaigns against India. She was buried under thick snow.

As one of the many wives of Genghis Khan, Abika Khulan held a special place both in the Mongol Empire and in Genghis Khan's heart.

== In popular culture ==
- Khulan was portrayed in the 2007 Japanese film Genghis Khan: To the Ends of the Earth and Sea, played by South Korean actress and model Go Ara.
- A fictionalized version of Khulan Khatun features in the 2021 manga series A Witch's Life in Mongol, which was adapted into an anime in 2026.
