= Nökör =

Type of Mongolian soldier

The term nökör (Mongolian: нөхөр comrade, companion, friend) was applied in the time of Genghis Khan to soldiers who abandoned their family ties and devoted themselves exclusively to their leader. The nature of their bond to the leader was of friendship or individual pledges, rather than hereditary obligations. They were valiant and loyal fighters. Many of the most prominent generals of Genghis Khan were nökhör.

Today the term is used more loosely. Derivatives of the term are found in several languages, including Azerbaijani (nökər), Armenian (նոքար nokʽar), Persian (نوکر nokar), Hindustani (نَوکَر/नौकर naukar), Bengali (নওকর nôukôr) and Hungarian (nyögér).
