= Boraqchin (wife of Ögedei) =

Eldest wife of Ögedei Khan

- First wife of Ögedei Khan
- Born: unknown date
- Died: Karakorum, Mongol Empire
- Burial: Karakorum
- Spouse: Ögedei Khan
- Religion: Tengrism

Boraqchin was the first and eldest wife of Ögedei Khan. Some sources state that she was of the Khongirad clan which seems believable considering that many ancestors and descendants of her husband Ögedei and Genghis Khan had also taken wives from this tribe.

They had no surviving children.

The earliest known Sino-Mongolian inscription, from 1240, mentions a "Yeke Qadun" or "Great empress". Some scholars have identified this figure with Boraqchin, while others argue that the inscription refers to Ögedei Khan's second wife, Töregene Khatun.

== In popular culture ==
A fictionalized version of Boraqchin features as a key antagonist to the protagonist in the 2021 manga series A Witch's Life in Mongol which was adapted into an anime television series in 2026.

== See also ==
- History of Mongolia
- Ogedei Khan
