= Battle of Khalakhaljid Sands =

1203 Mongol battle

Battle of Khalkhaljid Sands
- Part of Campaigns of Genghis Khan
Date	1203
Location	Khalakhaljid Sands, Mount Mauo, Mongolia
Result	Comprehensive Kereit victory

Belligerents
Borjigin Mongols	Kereit tribe

Commanders and leaders
Temujin; Ögedei (WIA)	Toghrul Khan; Jamukha

Strength
2,500	3,000

Casualties and losses
Ögedei wounded and missing	Unknown

The Battle of Khalakhaljid Sands was fought between Genghis Khan, then known as Temüjin, and the forces of Toghrul, khan of the Kereit. The Kereit elites, deeply suspicious of Temüjin's diplomatic overtures to Toghrul, had convinced their leader to turn on his vassal. Warned by two herdsmen, Temüjin had escaped a planned ambush but was pursued by a larger force. His Mongol allies came to his aid at the Khalakhaljid Sands, but they were defeated. Following the battle, in which Temüjin's 17-year-old son Ögedei was severely wounded, Temüjin swore the Baljuna Covenant with his companions.
