= Ögedei Khan =

Khan of the Mongol Empire from 1229 to 1241

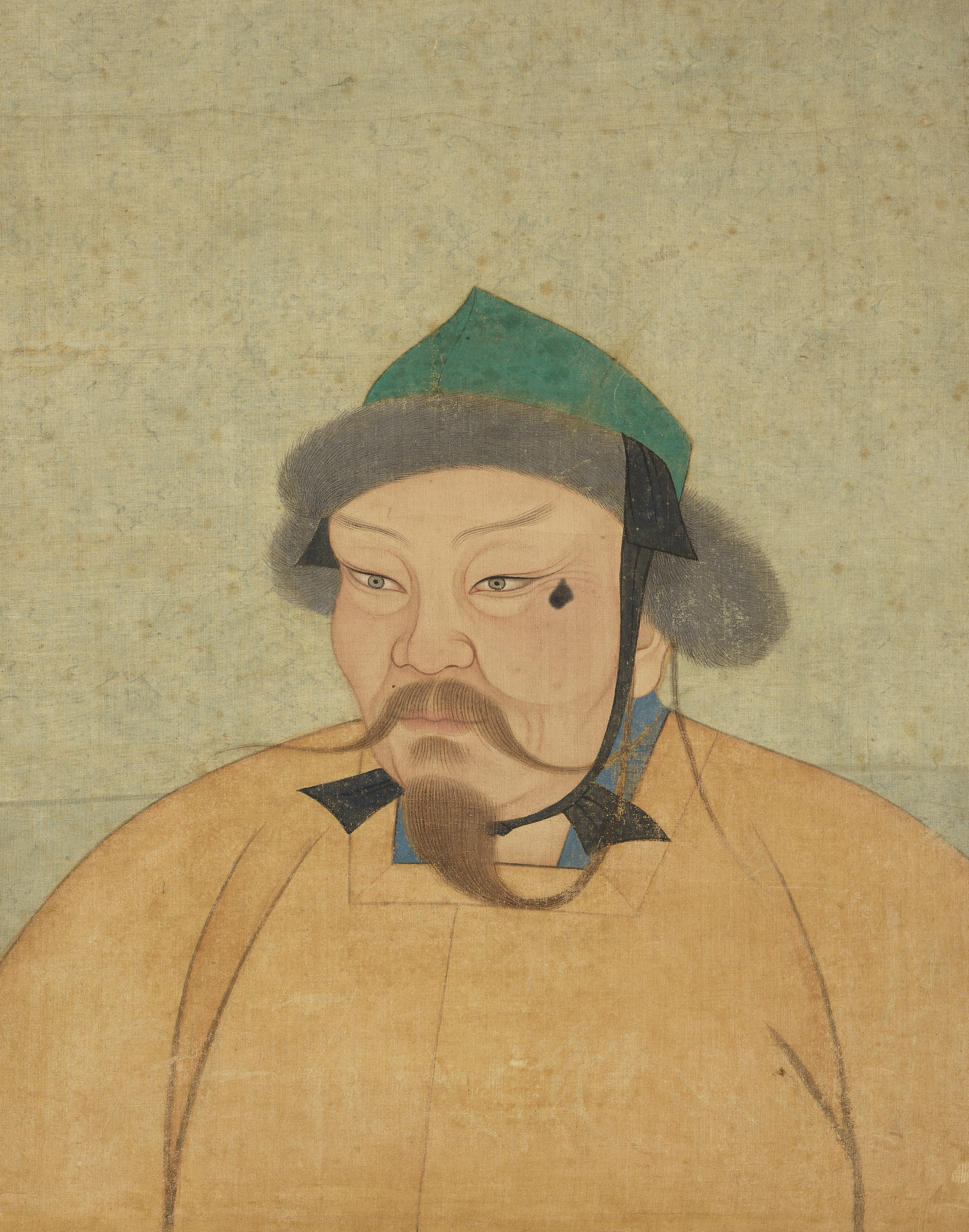
- Ögedei Khan portrayed in a 14th-century Yuan-era album, originally painted in 1278 (National Palace Museum, Taipei)

Khagan of the Mongol Empire
- Reign: 13 September 1229 – 11 December 1241
- Coronation: 13 September 1229
- Predecessor: Genghis Khan; Tolui (regent)
- Successor: Töregene (regent); Güyük Khan
- Born: c. 1186; Khamag Mongol
- Died: 11 December 1241 (aged 54–55); Mongol Empire
- Burial: Unknown, presumptively Burkhan Khaldun (Note: According to History of Yuan, Ögedei was buried at Qinian valley (起輦谷). The concrete location of the valley is never mentioned in any documents, many assume that it is somewhere close to the Onon River and the Burkhan Khaldun mountain, Khentii Province, present-day Mongolia.)
- Spouse: Borakchin Khatun; Töregene Khatun; Möge Khatun; Alqui Khatun; Kirgistani Khatun; Kujulder Khatun; Jujai Khatun; Jachin Khatun; Erkene Khatun
- Issue: Güyük; Godan; Khochu; Kharachar; Khashi; Kadan; Melig
Names
- Mongol script: ᠥᠭᠡᠳᠡᠢ ᠬᠠᠭᠠᠨ Ögedei Khagan
Posthumous name
- Emperor Yingwen (英文皇帝)
Temple name
- Taizong (太宗)
- House: Borjigin (by birth); House of Ogedei (founder)
- Father: Genghis Khan
- Mother: Börte
- Religion: Tengrism

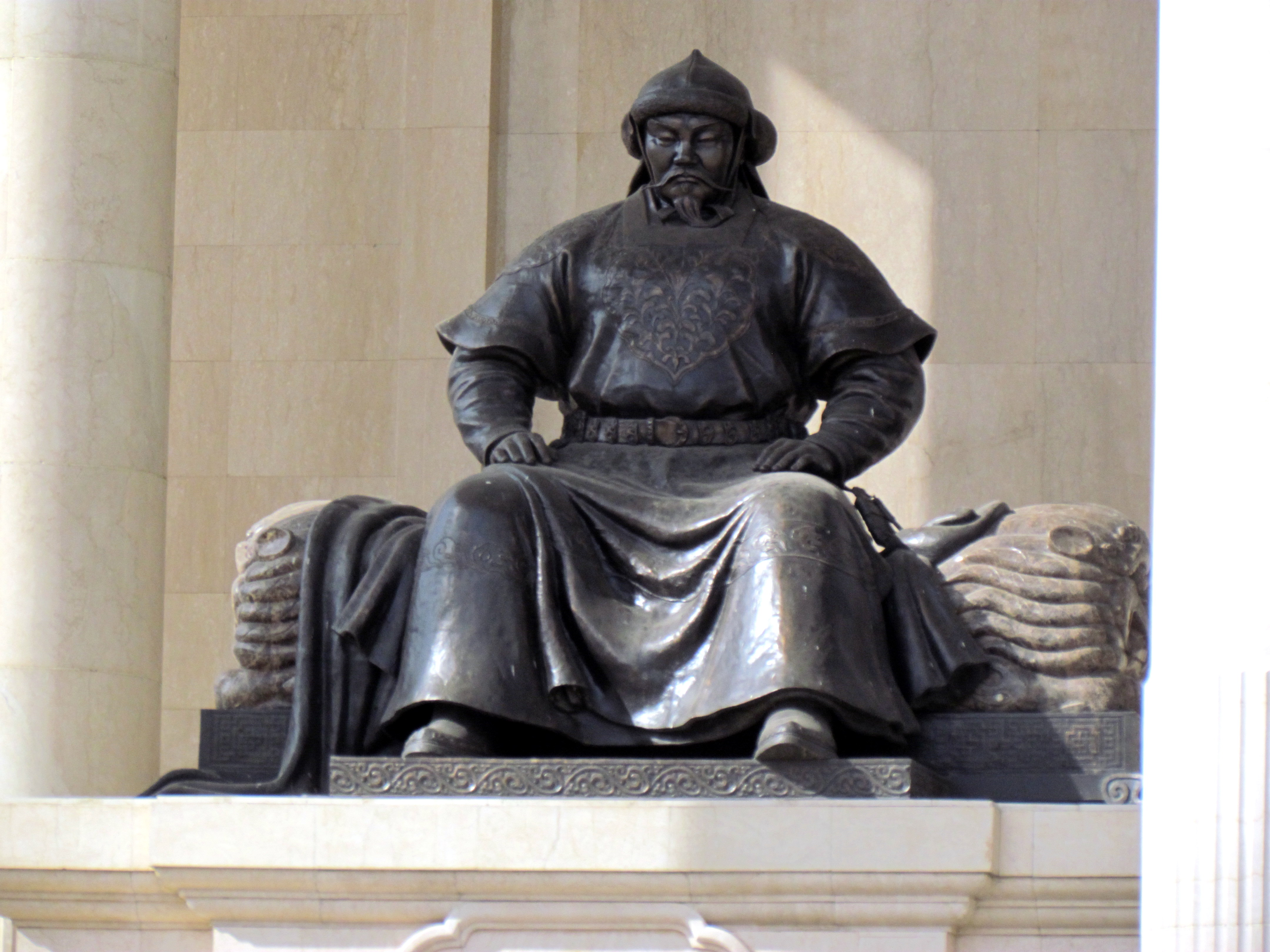
Statue of Ögedei Khan in Sükhbaatar Square, Ulaanbaatar. Together with Kublai Khan's, and the much larger Genghis Khan's statues, it forms a statue complex dedicated to the Mongol Empire.

Ögedei Khan (also Ögedei Khagan or Ogodei; (Note: Mongolian: Өгэдэй, romanized: Ögedei, Mongolian: ᠥᠭᠡᠳᠡᠢ Ögedei, ᠥᠭᠦᠳᠡᠢ Ögüdei; Chinese: 窩闊台; pinyin: Wōkuòtái) c. 1186 – 11 December 1241) was the second khan of the Mongol Empire. The third son of Genghis Khan, he continued the expansion of the empire that his father had begun.

Born in c. 1186 AD, Ögedei fought in numerous battles during his father's rise to power. After being granted a large appanage and taking a number of wives, including Töregene, he played a prominent role in the Mongol invasion of the Khwarazmian Empire. When his older brothers Jochi and Chagatai quarrelled over strategies when besieging Gurganj, Genghis appointed Ögedei sole commander; his successful capture of the city in 1221 ensured his military reputation. He was confirmed as heir after further infighting between his elder brothers led to both being excluded from succession plans. Genghis died in 1227, and Ögedei was elected as khan in 1229, after a two-year regency led by his younger brother Tolui.

As khan, Ögedei pursued the expansionist policies of his father. He launched a second invasion of Persia led by Chormaqan Noyan in 1230, which subdued the Khwarazmian prince Jalal al-Din Mangburni and began to subjugate Georgia. He initiated the Mongol invasions of Korea in 1231 and completed the Mongol conquest of the Jin dynasty in 1234, and his armies skirmished with the Song dynasty and in India. By the time of his death in 1241, large armies under the command of his nephew Batu Khan and the great general Subutai had subdued the steppes and penetrated deep into Europe. These armies defeated Poland at Legnica and Hungary at Mohi before retreating. It is likely that this retreat was caused by the need to find a successor after Ögedei's death, although some scholars have speculated that the Mongols were simply unable to invade further because of logistical difficulties.

As an administrator, Ögedei continued to develop the fast-growing Mongol state. Working with officials such as Yelü Chucai, he developed ortogh trading systems, instituted methods of tax collection, and established regional bureaucracies which controlled legal and economic affairs. He also founded the Mongol capital city, Karakorum, in the 1230s. Although historically disregarded in comparison to his father, especially on account of his alcoholism, he was known to be charismatic, good-natured, and intelligent. He was succeeded by his son Güyük.

== Background ==
Ögedei was the third son of Temüjin and Börte Ujin. He participated in the turbulent events of his father's rise. When Ögedei was 17 years old, Temüjin experienced the disastrous defeat of Khalakhaljid Sands against the army of Jamukha. Ögedei was heavily wounded and lost on the battlefield. His father's adopted brother and companion Borokhula rescued him. Although he was already married, in 1204 his father gave him Töregene, the wife of a defeated Merkit chief. The addition of such a wife was not uncommon in steppe culture.

After Temüjin was proclaimed Genghis Khan in 1206, myangans (thousands) of the Jalayir, Besud, Suldus, and Khongqatan clans were given to him as his appanage. Ögedei's territory occupied the Emil and Hobok rivers. According to his father's wish, Ilugei, the commander of the Jalayir, became Ögedei's tutor.

Ögedei, along with his brothers, campaigned independently for the first time in November 1211 against the Jin dynasty. He was sent to ravage the land south through Hebei and then north through Shanxi in 1213. Ögedei's force drove the Jin garrison out of the Ordos, and he rode to the juncture of the Xi Xia, Jin, and Song domains.

During the Mongol conquest of Khwarezmia, Ögedei and Chagatai massacred the residents of Otrar after a five-month siege in 1219–20 and joined Jochi who was outside the walls of Urganch. Because Jochi and Chagatai were quarreling over the military strategy, Ögedei was appointed by Genghis Khan to oversee the siege of Urganch. They captured the city in 1221. When the rebellion broke out in southeast Persia and Afghanistan, Ögedei also pacified Ghazni.

=== Position as heir ===
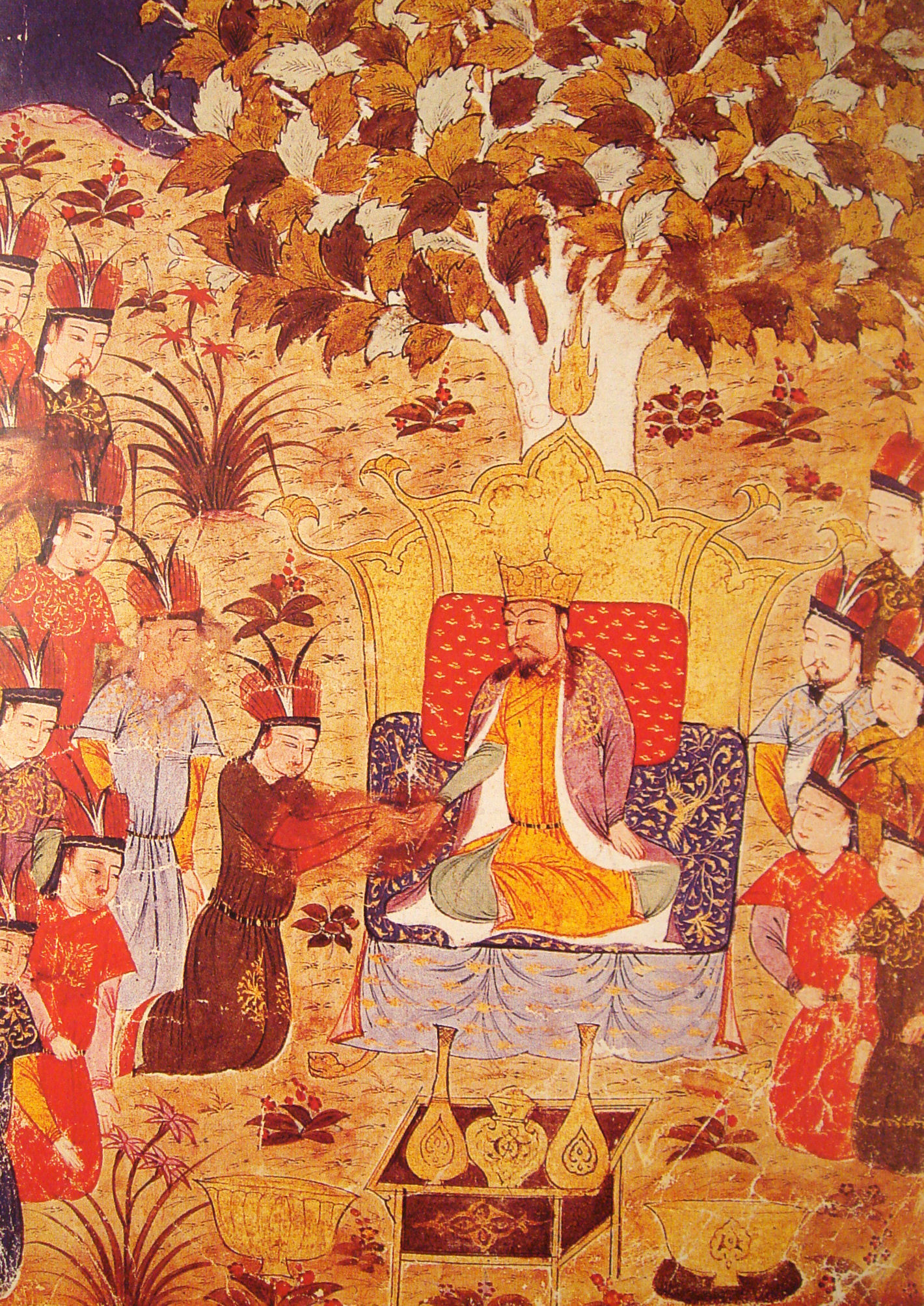
Coronation of Ögedei in 1229, by Rashid al-Din, early 14th century

The Empress Yisui insisted that Genghis Khan designate an heir before the invasion of the Khwarezmid Empire in 1219. After the terrible brawl between two elder sons Jochi and Chagatai, they agreed that Ögedei was to be chosen as heir. Genghis confirmed their decision.

Genghis Khan died in 1227, and Jochi had died a year or two earlier. Ögedei's younger brother Tolui held the regency until 1229. Ögedei was elected supreme khan in 1229, according to the kurultai held at Kodoe Aral on the Kherlen River after Genghis' death, although this was never really in doubt as it was Genghis' clear wish that he be succeeded by Ögedei. After ritually declining three times, Ögedei was proclaimed Khan of the Mongols on 13 September 1229 at the Kurultai of the Kherlen's Khödöö Aral. Chagatai continued to support his younger brother's claim.

== World conquests ==
=== Expansion in the Middle East ===
After destroying the Khwarazmian empire, Genghis Khan was free to move against Western Xia. In 1226, however, Jalal al-Din Mangburni, the last of the Khwarezm monarchs, returned to Persia to revive the empire lost by his father, Muhammad ‘Ala al-Din II. The Mongol forces sent against him in 1227 were defeated at Dameghan. Another army that marched against Jalal al-Din scored a pyrrhic victory in the vicinity of Isfahan but was unable to follow up that success.

With Ögedei's consent to launch a campaign, Chormaqan Noyan left Bukhara at the head of 30,000 to 50,000 Mongol soldiers. He occupied Persia and Khorasan, two long-standing bases of Khwarazmian support. Crossing the Amu Darya River in 1230 and entering Khorasan without encountering any opposition, Chormaqan passed through quickly. He left a sizable contingent behind under the command of Dayir Baghatur, who had further instructions to invade western Afghanistan. Chormaqan and the majority of his army then entered Tabaristan (modern-day Mazandaran), a region between the Caspian Sea and Alborz mountains, in the autumn of 1230, thus avoiding the mountainous area to the south, which was controlled by the Nizari Ismailis (the Assassins).

Upon reaching the city of Rey, Chormaqan made his winter camp there and dispatched his armies to pacify the rest of northern Persia. In 1231, he led his army southward and quickly captured the cities of Qum and Hamadan. From there, he sent armies into the regions of Fars and Kirman, whose rulers quickly submitted, preferring to pay tribute to Mongol overlords rather than having their states ravaged. Meanwhile, further east, Dayir Baghatur steadily achieved his goals in capturing Kabul, Ghazni, and Zabulistan. With the Mongols already in control of Persia, Jalal al-Din was isolated in Transcaucasia where he was banished. Thus all of Persia was added to the Mongol Empire.

=== The fall of the Jin dynasty ===
At the end of 1230, responding to the Jins' unexpected defeat of Doqolqu Cherbi (Mongol general), Ögedei went south to Shanxi with Tolui, clearing the area of the Jin forces and taking the city of Fengxiang. After passing the summer in the north, they again campaigned against the Jin in Henan, cutting through territory of South China to assault the Jin's rear. By 1232 the Jin Emperor was besieged in his capital of Kaifeng. Ögedei soon departed, leaving the final conquest to his generals. After taking several cities, the Mongols, with the belated assistance of the Song dynasty, destroyed the Jin with the fall of Caizhou in February 1234. However, a viceroy of the Song murdered a Mongol ambassador, and the Song armies recaptured the former imperial capitals of Kaifeng, Luoyang, and Chang'an, which were now ruled by the Mongols.

In addition to the war with the Jin dynasty, Ögedei crushed the Eastern Xia founded by Puxian Wannu in 1233, pacifying southern Manchuria. Ögedei subdued the Water Tatars in the northern part of the region and suppressed their rebellion in 1237.

=== Conquest of Georgia and Armenia ===
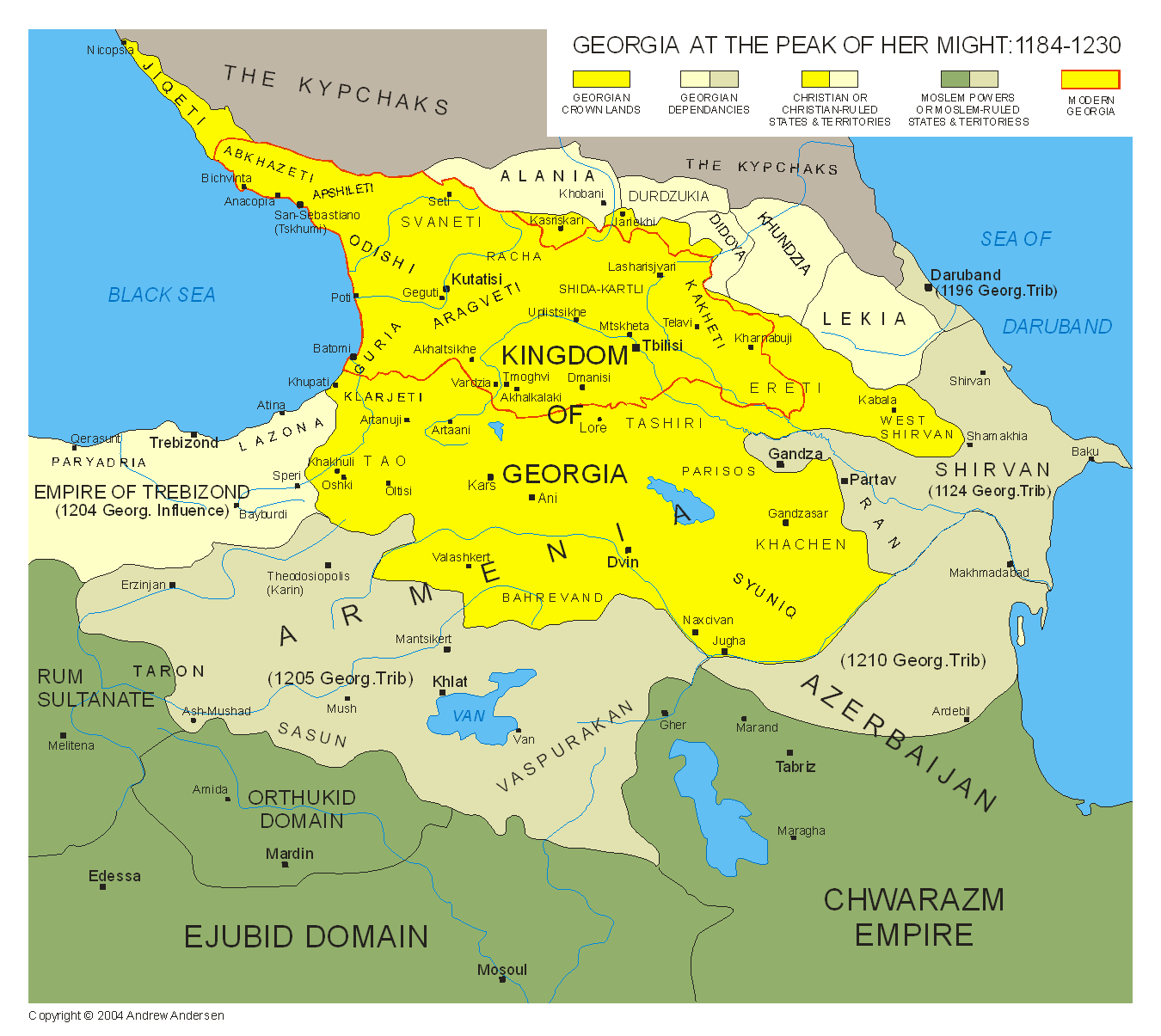
Kingdom of Georgia in 1184–1230

The Mongols under Chormaqan returned to the Caucasus in 1232. The walls of Ganja were breached by catapult and battering ram in 1235. The Mongols eventually withdrew after the citizens of Irbil agreed to send a yearly tribute to Ögedei's court. Chormaqan waited until 1238, when the force of Möngke Khan was also active in the north Caucasus. After subduing Armenia, Chormaqan took Tiflis. In 1238, the Mongols captured Lorhe whose ruler, Shahanshah, fled with his family before the Mongols arrived, leaving the rich city to its fate. After putting up a spirited defense at Hohanaberd, the city's ruler, Hasan Jalal, submitted to the Mongols. Another column then advanced against Gaian, ruled by Prince Avak. The Mongol commander Tokhta ruled out a direct assault and had his men construct a wall around the city, and Avak soon surrendered. By 1240, Chormaqan had completed the conquest of Transcaucasia, forcing the Georgian nobles to surrender.

=== Korea ===
In 1224, a Mongol envoy was killed in obscure circumstances and Korea stopped paying tribute. Ögedei dispatched Saritai Qorchi to subdue Korea and avenge the dead envoy in 1231. Thus, Mongol armies began to invade Korea in order to subdue the kingdom. The Goryeo King temporarily submitted and agreed to accept Mongol overseers. When they withdrew for the summer, however, Ch'oe U moved the capital from Kaesong to Ganghwa Island. Saritai was hit with a stray arrow and died as he campaigned against them.

Ögedei announced plans for the conquest of the Koreans, the Southern Song, the Kipchaks and their European allies, all of whom killed Mongol envoys, at the kurultai in Mongolia in 1234. Ögedei appointed Danqu commander of the Mongol army and made Bog Wong, a defected Korean general, governor of 40 cities with their subjects. When the court of Goryeo sued for peace in 1238, Ögedei demanded that the king of Goryeo appear before him in person. The Goryeo king finally sent his relative Yeong Nong-gun Sung with ten noble boys to Mongolia as hostages, temporarily ending the war in 1241.

=== Europe ===
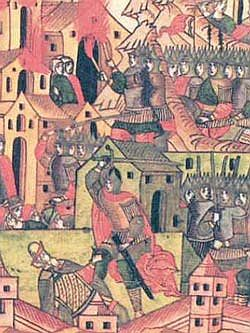
Detail of miniature from the Illustrated Chronicle of Ivan the Terrible depicting the Mongols capturing a city (16th century)

The Mongol Empire expanded westward under the command of Batu Khan to subdue the western steppes and drive into Europe. Their western conquests included Volga Bulgaria, almost all of Alania, Cumania, and Kievan Rus', along with a brief occupation of Hungary. They also invaded Poland, Croatia, Serbia, Bulgaria, the Latin Empire, and Austria. During the siege of Kolomna, Ögedei's half brother Khulgen (Note: Khulgen was the son of Genghis Khan by Khulan khatun of the Merkit clan.) was killed by an arrow.

Amid the conquest, Ögedei's son Güyük and Chagatai's grandson Büri ridiculed Batu, and the Mongol camp suffered dissension. Ögedei harshly criticized Güyük: "You broke the spirit of every man in your army... Do you think that the Russians surrendered because of how mean you were to your own men?" He then sent Güyük back to continue the conquest of Europe. Güyük and another of Ögedei's sons, Kadan and Melig attacked Transylvania and Poland, respectively.

Although Ögedei Khan had granted permission to invade the remainder of Europe, all the way to the "Great Sea", the Atlantic Ocean, the Mongol advance stopped in East Europe early in 1242, the year after his death. Most historians agree with Mongol accounts which attribute the drive's failure to his untimely demise necessitating Batu's withdrawal to personally participate in the election of Ögedei's successor. Batu, however, never reached Mongolia for such an election and a successor would not be named until 1246. A minority of historians have argued that the advance stalled because European fortifications posed a strategic problem for the Mongols.

=== Conflict with Song dynasty ===
In a series of razzias from 1235 to 1245, the Mongols commanded by Ögedei's sons penetrated deep into the Song dynasty and reached Chengdu, Xiangyang and Yangtze River. But they could not succeed in completing their conquest due to climate and the number of Song troops, and Ögedei's son Khochu died in the process. In 1240, Ögedei's other son Khuden dispatched a subsidiary expedition to Tibet. The situation between the two nations worsened when Song officers murdered Ögedei's envoys headed by Selmus.

The Mongol expansion throughout the Asian continent under the leadership of Ögedei helped bring political stability and re-establish the Silk Road, the primary trading route between East and West.

=== India ===
Ögedei appointed Dayir Baghatur in Ghazni and Menggetu Noyan in Qonduz. In winter 1241 the Mongol force invaded the Indus valley and besieged Lahore, which was controlled by the Delhi Sultanate. However, Dayir Baghatur died storming the town, on 30 December 1241, and the Mongols butchered the town before withdrawing from the Delhi Sultanate.

Some time after 1235 another Mongol force invaded Kashmir, stationing a darughachi there for several years. Soon Kashmir became a Mongolian dependency. Around the same time, a Kashmiri Buddhist master, Otochi, and his brother Namo arrived at the court of Ögedei.

== Administration ==
Ögedei began the bureaucratization of Mongol administration. Three divisions constituted his administration:

- the Christian eastern Turks, represented by Chinqai, the Uyghur scribe, and the Keraites.
- the Islamic circle, represented by two Khorazmians, Mahmud Yalavach, and Masud Beg.
- the North Chinese Confucian circle, represented by Yelu Chucai, a Khitan, and Nianhe Zhong-shan, a Jurchen.

Mahamud Yalavach promoted a system in which the government would delegate tax collection to tax farmers who collect payments in silver. Yelu Chucai encouraged Ögedei to institute a traditional Chinese system of government, with taxation in the hands of government agents and payment in a government issued currency. The Muslim merchants, working with capital supplied by the Mongol aristocrats, loaned at higher interest the silver needed for tax payments. In particular, Ögedei actively invested in these ortoq enterprises. At the same time the Mongols began circulating paper currency backed by silver reserves.

Ögedei Khan in traditional Mongolian script

Ögedei abolished the branch departments of state affairs and divided the areas of Mongol-ruled China into ten routes according to the suggestion of Yelü Chucai. He also divided the empire into Beshbalik and Yanjing administration, while the headquarters in Karakorum directly dealt with Manchuria, Mongolia and Siberia. Late in his reign, Amu Darya administration was established. Turkestan was administered by Mahamud Yalavach, while Yelu Chucai administered North China from 1229 to 1240. Ögedei appointed Shigi Khutugh chief judge in China. In Iran, Ögedei appointed first Chin-temur, a Kara-kitai, and then Korguz, an Uyghur who proved to be honest administrator. Later, some of Yelu Chucai's duties were transferred to Mahamud Yalavach and taxes were handed over to Abd-ur-Rahman, who promised to double the annual payments of silver. The Ortoq or partner merchants lent Ögedei's money at exorbitant rates of interest to the peasants, though Ögedei banned considerably higher rates. Despite it proving profitable, many people fled their homes to avoid the tax collectors and their strong-arm gangs.

Ögedei had imperial princes tutored by the Christian scribe Qadaq and the Taoist priest Li Zhichang and built schools and an academy. Ögedei Khan also decreed to issue paper currency backed by silk reserves and founded a department responsible for destroying old notes. Yelu Chucai protested to Ögedei that his large-scale distribution of appanages in Iran, Western and North China, and Khorazm could lead to a disintegration of the empire. Ögedei thus decreed that the Mongol nobles could appoint overseers in the appanages, but the court would appoint other officials and collect taxes.

He proclaimed the Great Yassa as an integral body of precedents, confirming the continuing validity of his father's commands and ordinances, while adding his own. Ögedei codified rules of dress and conduct during the kurultais. Throughout the empire, in 1234, he created postroad stations (Yam) with a permanent staff who would supply post riders' needs. Relay stations were set up every 25 miles and the yam staff supplied remounts to the envoys and served specified rations. The attached households were exempt from other taxes, but they had to pay a qubchuri tax to supply the goods. Ögedei ordered Chagatai and Batu to control their yams separately. He also prohibited the nobility from issuing paizas (tablets that gave the bearer authority to demand goods and services from civilian populations) and jarliqs. Ögedei decreed that within decimal units one out of every 100 sheep of the well-off should be levied for the poor of the unit, and that one sheep and one mare from every herd should be forwarded to form a herd for the imperial table.

=== Karakorum ===
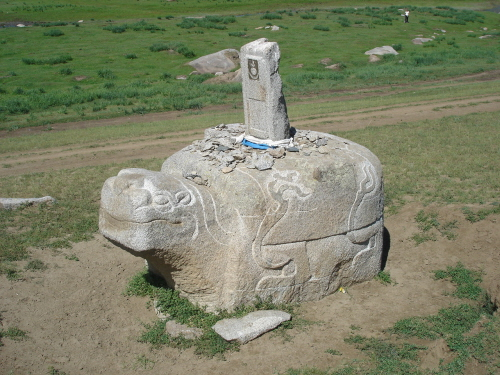
Stone tortoise of Karakorum

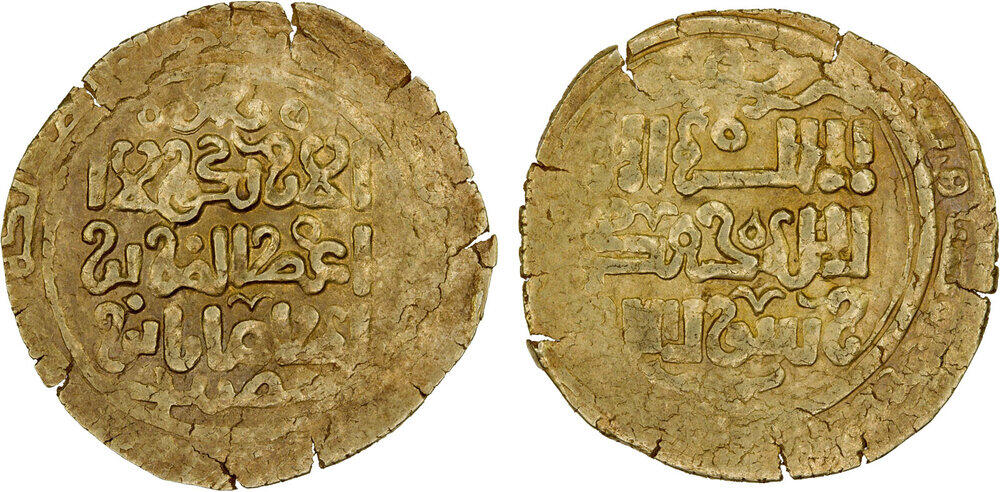
Islamic-style gold dinar minted in Karakorum during the reign of Ögedei Khan

From 1235 to 1238 Ögedei constructed a series of palaces and pavilions at stopping places in his annual nomadic route through central Mongolia. The first palace Wanangong was constructed by North Chinese artisans. The Emperor urged his relatives build residences nearby and settled the deported craftsmen from China near the site. The construction of the city, Karakorum (Хархорум), was finished in 1235, assigning different quarters to Islamic and North Chinese craftsmen, who competed to win Ögedei's favor. Earthen walls with 4 gates surrounded the city. Attached were private apartments, while in front of stood a giant stone tortoise bearing an engraved pillar, like those that were commonly used in East Asia. There was a castle with doors like the gates of the garden and a series of lakes where many water fowl gathered. Ögedei erected several houses of worship for his Buddhist, Muslim, Taoist, and Christian followers. In the Chinese ward, there was a Confucian temple where Yelu Chucai used to create or regulate a calendar on the Chinese model.

== Character ==
Ögedei was also known to be a humble man, who did not believe himself to be a genius, and who was willing to listen to and use the great generals that his father left him, as well as those he himself found to be most capable. He was the Emperor but not a dictator. Like all Mongols at his time, he was raised and educated as a warrior from childhood, and as the son of Genghis Khan, he was a part of his father's plan to establish a world empire. His military experience was notable for his willingness to listen to his generals and adapt to circumstances. He was a pragmatic person, much like his father, and looked at the end rather than the means. His steadiness of character and dependability were the traits that his father most valued, and that gained him the role of successor to his father, despite his two older brothers.

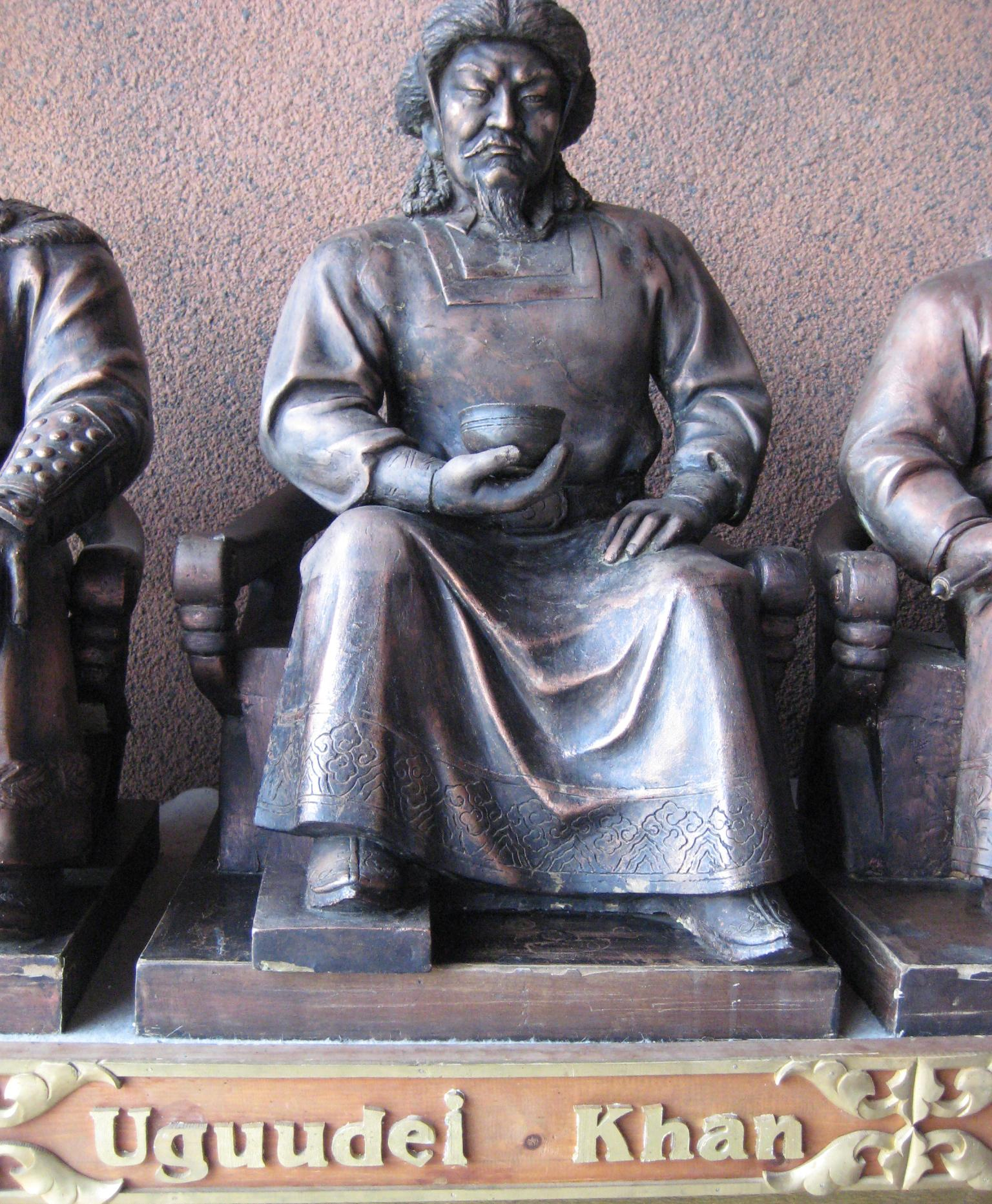
Statue of Ögedei Khan in Mongolia

Ögedei was considered to be his father's favorite son, ever since his childhood. As an adult, he was known for his ability to sway doubters in any debate in which he was involved, simply by the force of his personality. He was a physically big, jovial, and charismatic man, who seemed mostly to be interested in enjoying good times. He was intelligent and steady in character. His charisma was partially credited for his success in keeping the Mongol Empire on the path that his father had set. Ögedei was a pragmatic man, though he made some mistakes during his reign. Ögedei had no delusions that he was his father's equal as a military commander or organizer and used the abilities of those he found most capable.

The sudden death of Tolui in 1232 seems to have affected Ögedei deeply. According to some sources, Tolui sacrificed his own life, accepting a poisoned drink in shamanist ritual in order to save Ögedei who was suffering from illness. Other sources say Ögedei orchestrated Tolui's death with the help of shamans who drugged the alcoholic Tolui.

According to Pamela Kyle Crossley, a posthumous Yuan dynasty portrait of Ögedei depicts him as having a stocky build, a red beard, and hazel eyes. Contemporary Chinese authors such as Xu Ting wrote that Ögedei's beard was unusual for a Mongol because most had little facial hair.

=== Alleged mass rape ===
According to Persian chroniclers, Ögedei ordered the rape of four thousand Oirat girls above the age of seven. These girls were then confiscated for Ögedei's harem or given to caravan hostels throughout the Mongol Empire for use as prostitutes. This move brought the Oirat and their lands under Ögedei's control following the death of Ögedei's sister Checheyigen, who previously controlled Oirat lands.

Anne F. Broadbridge links an "infamous alleged mass rape of Oirat girls" to Ögedei's requisitioning of girls from his uncle Temüge Otchigin's territories without Temüge's approval. Broadbridge notes however that "with all the evidence suppressed, this can only be a surmise". The History of the Yuan or Yuanshi and Secret History of the Mongols speak of a forceful requisitioning of women by Ögedei from the "left wing" and "uncle Otchigin's domain" respectively but do not mention a rape. In the Secret History Ögedei expresses remorse for his act stating "as to my second fault, to listen to the word of a woman without principle, and to have the girls of my uncle Otchigin's domain brought to me was surely a mistake" but De Rachewiltz notes that the entire paragraph listing four good deeds and four mistakes may be a posthumous assessment.

The only account alleging a rape is in Chapter 32 of the Tarikh-i Jahangushay (History of the World Conqueror) written in 1252 by Juvayni (1226–1283). In Chapter 32 Juvayni starts by praising Ögedei Khan then proceeds to give 50 highly detailed anecdotes to illustrate Ögedei's "clemency, forgiveness, justice and generosity" followed by one anecdote to illustrate his "violence, severity, fury and awesomeness" which was the rape incident. This anecdote closes the chapter. The name of the tribe is unclear in two manuscripts of Juvayni but Manuscript D and Rashid-Al-Din give it as Oirat. Broadbridge and De Rachewiltz questioned the factual accuracy of this identification with the Oirats.

== Death and aftermath ==
Ögedei was well known for his alcoholism. Chagatai entrusted an official to watch his habit, but Ögedei managed to drink anyway. It is commonly told that Ögedei did so by vowing to reduce the number of cups he drank a day then having cups twice the size created for his personal use. When he died at dawn on 11 December 1241, after a late-night drinking bout with Abd-ur-Rahman, the people blamed the sister of Tolui's widow and Abd-ur-Rahman. The Mongol aristocrats recognized, however, that the khan's own lack of self-control had killed him.

In the Tarikh-i Jahangushay claims Ögedei died shortly after his lion-like hounds chased and tore to pieces a wolf he saved and released despite his having hoped God Almighty would spare his ill bowels if he released a living creature. This anecdote (Anecdote 47) contradicts the standard account of Ögedei's death from a late-night drinking bout with Abd-ur-Rahman.

In the early 1230s, Ögedei had nominated his son Kuchu as his heir; following Kuchu's death in 1236, he named his grandson Shiremun as his heir. His preference was not binding on the Mongols. Güyük eventually succeeded him after the five-year regency of his widow Töregene Khatun. However, Batu, the Khan of the Golden Horde (also known as the Kipchak Khanate or the Ulus of Jochi), only nominally accepted Güyük, who died on the way to confront Batu. It was not until 1255, well into the reign of Möngke Khan, that Batu felt secure enough to again prepare to invade Europe. He died before his plans could be implemented.

When Kublai Khan established the Yuan dynasty in 1271, he had Ögedei Khan placed on the official record as Taizong (Chinese: 太宗). Ögedei was also given the posthumous name of Emperor Yingwen (英文皇帝) in 1266.

== Wives, concubines, and children ==
Like his father Genghis Khan, Ögedei had many wives and sixty concubines: Ögedei married first Boraqchin and then Töregene. Other wives included Möge Khatun (former concubine of Genghis Khan) and Jachin Khatun.

Principal wives:

- Empress Boraqchin (孛剌合真皇后)
- Empress Zhaoci, of the Naiman tribe (昭慈皇后 乃蠻氏; d.1246), personal name Töregene (脱列哥那)
  - Güyük, Khan of the Mongols (貴由汗; c. 19 March 1206 – 20 April 1248), 1st son
  - Köchü (闊出; died 1237), 3rd son
  - Qarachar (哈剌察児), 4th son
  - Qashi (合失; d.1234), 5th son
- Empress Möge, of the Bakrin tribe (木哥; d.1242)
- Empress Hutieni (乞里吉忽帖尼 为乞里吉思氏) of the Chingissid clan
  - Koden (闊端太子; 1206–1251), 2nd son

Concubines:

- Concubine Ergene (业里吉纳妃子)
  - Kadan (合丹), 6th son
  - Melik (灭里), 7th son

Unknown:

  - Sürkhakhan, Princess of Lu State (鲁国公主 唆儿哈罕)
    - married Nahe (纳合) of the Hongjila tribe, grandson of Anchen

== Family ==
Khagans or regents of the Mongol Empire are in bold. Source:

Hoelun	Yesugei Baghatur
Börte	**Genghis Khan**	Hasar	Hachiun	Temüge
Jochi	Chagatai	**Ögedei**	Tolui	Sorghaghtani; Beki
**Güyük**	**Möngke**	**Kublai**	Hulagu	Ariq Böke
Zhenjin	Abaqa Khan
**Temür**	Arghun

Ögedei Khan House of Borjigin (1206–1634) Born: 1186 Died: 1241
Regnal titles
Preceded by Tolui	Khagan-Emperor of the Mongol Empire; 1229–1241	Succeeded by Töregene Khatun (regent)
