= Alexandria (disambiguation) =

Alexandria is a city in Egypt.

Alexandria may also refer to:

== Places ==
=== Alexander the Great-related ===
Middle East, Caucasus, Central and South Asia

These are places named for, and sometimes founded by, Alexander the Great, arranged roughly west to east:

- Alexandria Governorate, Egypt
- Alexandria Troas, in the ancient Troad, Asia Minor, near modern Dalyan, Turkey
- Alexandria ad Latmum, in ancient Caria, probably near modern Karpuzlu, Turkey
- Alexandria ad Issum, in ancient Syria, near modern İskenderun, Turkey
- Iskandariya (Alexandria), in ancient Mesopotamia, modern Iraq
- Alexandria in Susiana, later Charax Spasinu, modern Iraq
- Alexandria Carmania, unknown location, Iran
- Alexandria in the Caucasus, modern Bagram, Afghanistan
- Alexandria Arachosia, modern Kandahar, Afghanistan
- Alexandria Ariana, possibly modern Herat, Afghanistan
- Alexandria in Opiania, modern Ghazni, Afghanistan
- Alexandria Prophthasia, location unknown, in modern Afghanistan
- Alexandria on the Oxus, Bactria, in modern Afghanistan
- Alexandria in Margiana or Merv, Bactria, in modern Turkmenistan
- Alexandria Eschate, Fergana, modern Tajikistan
- Alexandria Bucephalous, modern Punjab, Pakistan
- Alexandria Nicaea, modern Nicaea, Punjab, Pakistan
- Alexandria on the Indus, possibly modern Uch, Pakistan
- Alexandria in Orietai, possibly near modern Bela, Pakistan
- Alexandria Hyphasis, modern East Punjab, India

=== Americas ===
==== Canada ====
- Alexandria, British Columbia, a hamlet
- Alexandria First Nation, a community in North Cariboo region of British Columbia
- Alexandria, Ontario, a community
  - Alexandria Aerodrome

==== Latin America ====
- Alexandria, Rio Grande do Norte, Brazil
- Alexandria, Jamaica

==== United States ====
- Alexandria Township (disambiguation), various localities in the United States
- Alexandria, Alabama, an unincorporated community
- Alexandria, Indiana, a city
- Alexandria, Kentucky, a city
- Alexandria, Louisiana, a city
  - Alexandria, Louisiana metropolitan area
- Alexandria, Missouri, a city
- Alexandria, Minnesota, a city
- Alexandria, Nebraska, a village
- Alexandria, New Hampshire, a town
- Alexandria, New York, a town
- Alexandria Bay, New York
- Alexandria, Ohio, a village
- Alexandria, Scioto County, Ohio, an unincorporated community
- West Alexandria, Ohio, a village
- Alexandria, Pennsylvania, a borough
- Alexandria, South Dakota, a city
- Alexandria, Tennessee, a town
- Alexandria, Virginia, a city
  - Alexandria Union Station
- Alexandria County, formerly in the District of Columbia and later in Virginia

=== Australia ===
- Alexandria, New South Wales, a suburb of Sydney
- Alexandria Station (Northern Territory), a cattle station

=== Europe ===
- Aleksandria (disambiguation), multiple places in Poland and Bulgaria
- Alessandria, a city in Piemonte, Italy
- Alexandreia, Greece, also spelled Alexandria, a city
- Alexandria, Romania, a municipality
- Alexandria, West Dunbartonshire, town in Scotland
- Oleksandriia (disambiguation), multiple places in Ukraine

=== South Africa ===
- Alexandria, Eastern Cape, South Africa
- Alexandria, Mpumalanga, South Africa

== Art, entertainment, and media ==
=== Fictional entities and places ===
- Alexandria, a heroic character in Worm (web serial)
- Alexandria, a character in Xenoblade Chronicles 3
- Alexandria, in the game Dragon Quest VIII: Journey of the Cursed King
- Alexandria, in the PlayStation game Final Fantasy IX
- New Alexandria, a city in the Xbox 360 game Halo: Reach
- Alexandria, a community of survivors in The Walking Dead comic and TV series

=== Film ===
- Alexandria (film), a 2005 Indonesian film
- Alexandria... Why?, Alexandria Again and Forever and Alexandria... New York, films by Youssef Chahine

=== Literature ===
- Alexandria (novel), 2009 novel by Lindsey Davis
- The Alexandria Quartet a tetralogy by Lawrence Durrell

=== Music ===
- Alexandria (album), 1989 album by Adrian Borland
- OST Alexandria, a soundtrack album of the 2005 film

== Sports clubs ==
- Al Ittihad Alexandria Club, an Egyptian football club
- Philippos Alexandreia F.C., a Greek football club

== Other uses ==
- Alexandria (given name), people with the name Alexandria
- Alexandria (library software), library automation software
- Alexandria (schooner), a three-masted schooner
- Alexandria (typeface), a serif font typeface created by Hank Gillete
- Alexandria Airlines, an Egyptian airline
- Alexandria false antechinus Pseudantechinus mimulus, a small carnivorous marsupial
- Alexandria toadlet Uperoleia orientalis, a species of frog
- Alexandria University, a public research university in Alexandria, Egypt
- Alexandria Channel, an Egyptian regional television channel
- Alexandria Theater (San Francisco)

== See also ==
- Alejandría, Colombia
- Alessandria (disambiguation)
- Alexandra (disambiguation)
- Alexandria Airport (disambiguation)
- Alexandria Canal (disambiguation)
- Alexandria High School (disambiguation)
- Alexandria Station (disambiguation)
