= Kondor =

Kondor may refer to:

== Places ==
Iran

- Kondor, Alborz
- Kondor, Chaharmahal and Bakhtiari
- Kondor, East Azerbaijan
- Kondor, Hamadan
- Kondor, Kerman
- Kondor, Lorestan
- Kondor, Qazvin
- Kondor, Razavi Khorasan
- Kondor, Birjand, South Khorasan
- Kondor, Nehbandan, South Khorasan
- Kondor, West Azerbaijan

== Other uses ==
- Kondor (surname), people with this name
- Kondor (automobile), a German automobile
- Kondor (satellite), a series of Russian spacecraft
- Kondor D.6, a German biplane
- Kondor D.7, a German biplane
- Kondor (software), a software edited by teciem

== See also ==
- Kandar (disambiguation)
- Kandor (disambiguation)
- Kondar (disambiguation)
- Condor (disambiguation)
