= Kandar =

Kandar may refer to:

== Places ==
India

- Kandar, village in Karmala Taluka, Solapur District, Maharashtra

Iran

- Kandar-e Abdol Reza, Fars Province
- Kandar-e Kolah Boland, Fars Province
- Kandar-e Mohammadi, Fars Province
- Kandar-e Sheykh, Fars Province
- Kandar, Qazvin

Pakistan

- Kandar, Pakistan, village in Khyber Pakhtunkhwa, Pakistan

Tunisia

- Kandar, Tunisia

== Other uses ==
- Kandar (fish), a species of fish

== See also ==
- Kandahar (disambiguation)
- Kandara (disambiguation)
- Kandari (disambiguation)
- Kandor (disambiguation)
- Kondar (disambiguation)
- Kondor (disambiguation)
- Kantar (disambiguation)
- Kantara (disambiguation)
- Qantara (disambiguation)
- Kundur (disambiguation)
