= Kandahar (disambiguation) =

Kandahar is a city in Afghanistan.

Kandahar may also refer to:

== Places ==
=== Afghanistan ===
- Kandahar
  - Kandahar District
  - Kandahar Province
  - Principality of Qandahar
  - Old Kandahar
  - Kandahar International Airport, in Kandahar, Afghanistan
  - Kandahar University, in Kandahar, Afghanistan

=== Azerbaijan ===
- Cəndəhar (also Çəndahar and Chandakhar)
- Çandahar (also Çandaxar, Chandakhar, and Ğəndahar)

=== Canada ===
- Kandahar, Saskatchewan

=== India ===
- Kandhar, city in Nanded, Maharashtra
  - Kandhar taluka, sub-district of Maharashtra
  - Kandhar Fort, fort in the city

=== Iran ===
- Kaneh Har, Kermanshah Province
- Kandeh-ye Har, Kermanshah Province

== Film and television ==
- Kandahar (2001 film), an Iranian film
- Kandagar (2010 film), a Russian film based on the 1995 Airstan incident
- Kandahar (2010 film), a Malayalam-language Indian war film
- Kandahar (2023 film), an American action thriller film
- "Kandahar" (The Punisher), an episode of The Punisher

== Sport ==
- Kandahar (ski course), classic ski World Cup downhill
- Arlberg-Kandahar, annual alpine skiing event

== Other uses ==
- HMS Kandahar (F28), a Royal Navy destroyer 1939–41
- Kandahar, a meteorite fall in 1959
- Kandahar, a ski run in Garmisch-Partenkirchen, Germany
- Kandahar, a ski run in Les Houches, France
- Adnan Kandhar or Khandhar (born 1986), Pakistani music video director

== See also ==
- Battle of Kandahar (disambiguation)
- Kandahari (disambiguation)
- Kandar (disambiguation)
- Kandara (disambiguation)
- Kandari (disambiguation)
- Kandhari, an Indian surname
- Gandhara (disambiguation)
- Gandahar (disambiguation)
- Gāndhārī (disambiguation)
- Alexandria (disambiguation)
- Alessandria (disambiguation)
- Arlberg-Kandahar alpine skiing event
- Kandahar Five, a group of men held prisoner in Kandahar
