= Kantara =

Kantara may refer to:

- Kantara (2022 film), also known as Kantara: A Legend, a 2022 Indian film
  - Kantara (soundtrack), soundtrack to the 2022 film
  - Kantara: Chapter 1, a 2025 Indian film prequel
- El Kantara, a town in Algeria
- El Kantara District, Algeria
- El Qantara, Egypt
- Qantara, Lebanon
- Kantara, İskele, a village in Cyprus
- Kantara Castle, a medieval castle in Cyprus
- Kantara Initiative, an IT consortium for interoperable digital identity systems
- Kantara or Mahakantara, names used in the Mahabharata for Maraguda, a valley in India

== See also ==
- Kantar (disambiguation)
- Qantara (disambiguation)
- Kandar (disambiguation)
- Kandara (disambiguation)
