= Qanater =

Qanater or qanatir (plural of qantara, Arabic word for arch, bridge) may refer to:

== Places ==
=== Algeria ===
- El Kantara
- El Kantara District

=== Egypt ===
- El Qantara, Egypt, a city on both sides of the Suez Canal

==== Giza Governorate ====
- Manshiyat al Qanater

==== Qalyubia Governorate ====
- El Qanater El Khayreya
- Shibin El Qanater

=== Lebanon ===
- Qantara (Akkar), a village in Akkar District, northern Lebanon
- Al-Qantara, Marjayoun, a village in Marjeyoun District, southern Lebanon

=== Spain ===
- Alcantarilla

=== Syria ===
- Qanater, Hama Governorate
- Umm el-Qanatir, Israeli-occupied Golan Heights

== Others ==
- Qantara.de, an Internet portal in German, English and Arabic

== See also ==
- Kantar (disambiguation)
- Kantara (disambiguation)
- Kandar (disambiguation)
- Kandara (disambiguation)
