= Kondar =

Kondar may refer to:

== Places ==
Iran

- Kondar, Chaharmahal and Bakhtiari
- Kondar, Qazvin
- Kondar, South Khorasan
- Kondor, Kerman

Tunisia

- Kondar, Tunisia

== Other uses ==
- Kondar, a Scheduled Tribe of India

== See also ==
- Kandar (disambiguation)
- Kandor (disambiguation)
- Kondor (disambiguation)
