= Gandhari (disambiguation) =

Gandhari is a character in the ancient Indian epic Mahabharata from the kingdom of Gandhara.

Gandhari may also refer to:

- Gandhari, something of, from or related to the Mahabharata kingdom of Gandhara (and other Indian epics), or the actual Gandhāra kingdom and Gandhara region in northwestern South Asia
  - Gandhari people, a tribe attested from the Rigveda and later texts
  - Gandhari language, north-western Prakrit (Middle Indo-Aryan language) spoken in Gāndhāra
    - Kharosthi, or Gandhari script
- Gandhari khilla, a hill fort near Bokkalagutta, Telangana, India
- Gandhari Amman Kovil, a Hindu temple in Thiruvananthapuram, Kerala, India
- Gāndhārī Temple, a Hindu temple in Hebbya village, Mysore, India
- Gandhari Valley, Jammu and Kashmir, India
- Gandhari (film), a 1993 Indian Malayalam-language film
- Gandhari (film), a 2026 Indian Hindi-language Netflix film
- "Gandhari" (song), a 2022 Telugu-language song by Indian musicians Ananya Bhat and Pawan Ch

== See also ==
- Kandahari (disambiguation)
- Kandari (disambiguation)
- Kandhari, an Indian surname
- Kandahar (disambiguation)
- Gandhara (disambiguation)
- Gandahar (disambiguation)
- Gandhar (disambiguation)
