= Kandari (disambiguation) =

Kandari is a census town in Jalgaon district in the Indian state of Maharashtra.

Kandari may also refer to:

== People ==
- Al-Kandari, Kuwaiti family

=== Surname ===
- Ali Al Kandari (born 1985), Kuwaiti footballer
- Anas Al Kandari (1981–2002)
- Matbar Singh Kandari, Indian politician

== See also ==
- Kandari Express, a superfast train in India
- Kandhari, an Indian surname
- Kandahari (disambiguation)
- Kandahar (disambiguation)
- Kandar (disambiguation)
- Kandara (disambiguation)
- Gandhara (disambiguation)
- Gandhari (disambiguation)
