= Sugandha (disambiguation) =

Sugandha was a queen of Kashmir.

Sugandha may also refer to:

- Sugandha Garg, Indian actress
- Sugandha Mishra, Indian actress, comedian and singer
- Sugandha Bai, a muse of Indian painter Raja Ravi Varma
- Sugandha Date, Indian singer
- Sugandha kokila oil, essential oil from the berries of the evergreen plant Cinnamomum glaucescens
- Sugandha, Hooghly, a village in West Bengal, India

== See also ==
- Gandha (disambiguation)
- Sugandhaparimalesvarar Temple, Tirumanancheri, Shiva temple in Tamil Nadu, India
- Peter Sugandhar (1944–2017), bishop of the Church of South India
