= Gandara =

Gandara may refer to:

== People ==
- Raúl Gándara Cartagena, long-time Ponce, Puerto Rico fire chief
- José N. Gándara Cartagena, the 19th-century physician from Ponce, Puerto Rico
- Antonio de la Gandara, 19th century painter, pastellist and draughtsman
- Mago Orona Gándara (1929-2018), Mexican-American muralist

== Places ==
- Gandara, Samar, a Philippine municipality
- Gandara, Buenos Aires, a village in Chascomús Partido, Argentina
- Gandara, Sri Lanka, a village in Matara, Sri Lanka
- Gándara, a river in Cantabria, Spain
- Gandhara, an ancient kingdom located in what is now northern Pakistan
- Residencial Gándara, a public housing development in Ponce, Puerto Rico

== Others uses ==
- Gammon, an adversary in the Samurai Shodown series of video games

== See also ==
- Gandhara (disambiguation)
- Kandara
- Ganadhara, a concept in Jainism
