= Alexandria Prophthasia =

City in Afghanistan

Alexandria Prophthasia Αλεξάνδρεια η Προφθασία
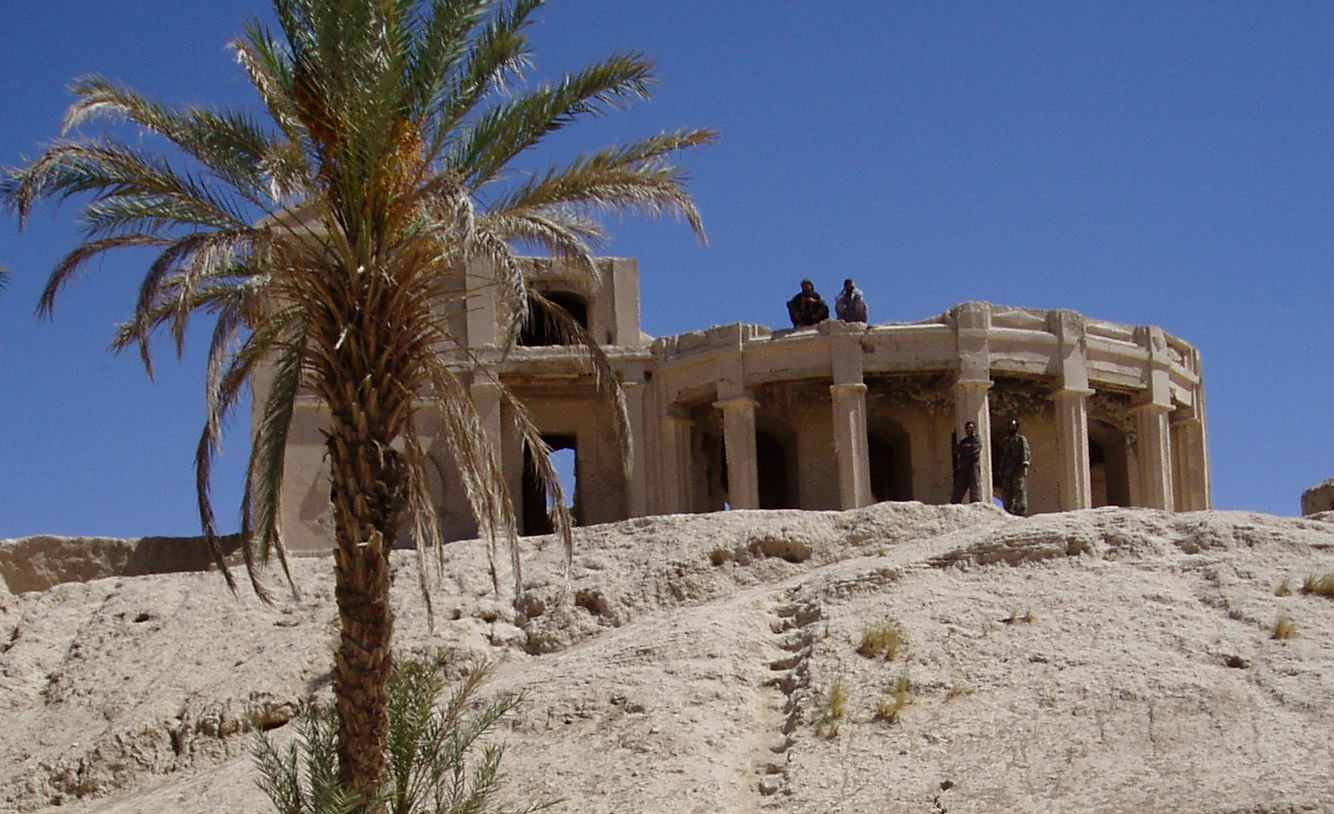
- The Farah Citadel in Farah, Afghanistan
- Interactive map of Alexandria Prophthasia
- Country: Afghanistan
- Founder: Alexander the Great

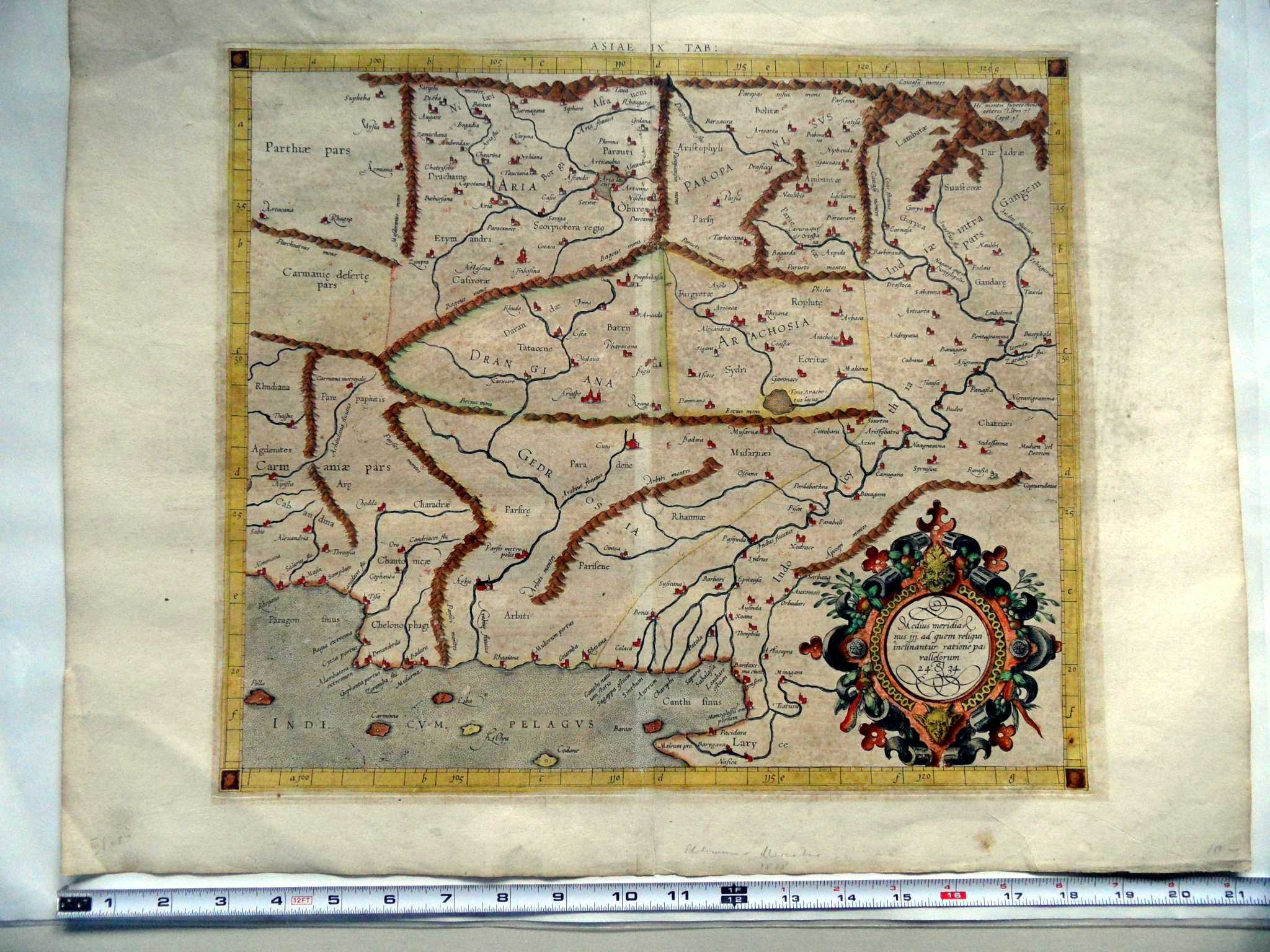
Mercator Map (1578); plate IX showing three of Alexander's foundations.

Alexandria Prophthasia (Greek: Αλεξάνδρεια η Προφθασία), also known as Alexandria in Drangiana, was one of the seventy-plus cities founded or renamed by Alexander the Great. The town was founded during an intermediate stop between Herat, in what is now Afghanistan, the location of another of Alexander's fortresses, and Kandahar.

It is mentioned by Strabo, Pliny the Elder, Ammianus Marcellinus, Isidore of Charax, Stephanus of Byzantium and Pseudo-Plutarch. Alexander the Great, arrived in Drangiana in November 330 BC on his way to Kandahar, and found a well-organized province of the Achaemenid Empire. He appointed a new satrap, Arsames, and renamed the capital city as Prophthasia, ("Anticipation"), because Alexander had here discovered a conspiracy against his life, organized by his companion Philotas.

== Location ==
The location of Prophthasia is currently unknown. Orthodox opinion is that Prophthasia was at Farah (also known as Phra) and that the citadel of Farah holds the remains of his fortress. However, taking distances given in Pliny, Eratosthenes and Strabo, Tarn believes Farah is too close to the city of Herat and the city was actually at nearby Zaranj. Others feel it was located at Nād-e 'Alī.

The 1578, a world map which Mercator constructed from Ptolemy's map shows the city some distance to the north of the Zaranji lakes. Similarly, the 13th century copy of the 4th century Peutinger Map shows Zaranj and Prophthasia as distinct locations.

== See also ==
- List of cities founded by Alexander the Great
