= Alexandria, Mpumalanga =

Alexandria Nkwenzela
- Location within Mpumalanga Location within South Africa
- Coordinates: 24.847°S 31.057°E
- Country: South Africa
- Province: Mpumalanga
- District: Ehlanzeni
- Municipality: Bushbuckridge

Government
  - Councillor: Sabelo Mkhabela (African National Congress)

Area
  - Total: 19.04 km^{2} (7.35 sq mi)

Population (2011)
  - Total: 21,506
  - Density: 1,130/km^{2} (2,925/sq mi)

Racial makeup (2011)
  - Black African: 99.7%
  - Coloured: 0.2%
  - White: 0.1%

First languages (2011)
  - Swazi: 40.3%
  - Zulu: 21.8%
  - Tsonga: 16.9%
  - Sotho: 12.4%
  - Other: 8.5%
- Time zone: UTC+2 (SAST)
- Postal code (street): 1280
- PO box: —
- Area code: 013

Alexandria is a town in Bushbuckridge Local Municipality under Ehlanzeni District Municipality in the Mpumalanga province of South Africa. It got its theme of footprints on rock in the mountains of Simeleni.

Bordering the Bhejane and Ngwenyameni rivers that connect with the Sabie River, Alexandria is known for its maize farming.

Its main source of income is taxi business. It consists of 7 schools. It has one major road that connects Marite and Oakley.

Its villages include Marongwana, Tekamahala, Buyelani and Nhlalakahle.

== History ==
In 1994, when the Transvaal Province was dismantled and divided into four Provinces, Alexandria, together with the rest of Bushbuckridge was included in Limpopo province. The decision was based on the fact that most of the Bushbuckridge area had been part of three separate bantustans — Gazankulu, Lebowa and KaNgwane. The citizens of Alexandria and other parts of Bushbuckridge became embroiled in a dispute with the government, demanding inclusion of the area in Mpumalanga province. They were concerned that should the area be included into Limpopo, they would be marginalised and suffer poor service delivery since Polokwane, the Capital city of Limpopo Province, is more than 300 km away, whereas Nelspruit, the capital of Mpumalanga is 58 km away. For more than two years the government refused to allow Bushbuckridge to fall under Mpumalanga, leading to violent protests and resistance from the community, which included stay-aways, road blockage with burning tyres and destruction of property, demonstrated mainly at the R40 road at Mariti market place.

A decision was taken at Cabinet level in 1998, to transfer the area to Mpumalanga. However, the area was not transferred to Mpumalanga until 2000 when President Thabo Mbeki and his Cabinet amended the Constitution and legally handed over Bushbuckridge to Mpumalanga. However, because of red tape it was not until 2005 that Bushbuckridge was officially transferred to Mpumalanga.

== Notable people ==
This village is under the leadership of Mathibela Traditional Council led by Kgoshi Lameck Mokoena who has also served as a Congress of Traditional Leaders of South Africa President.
