= Pukavik =

- Location within Blekinge Location within Sweden
- Coordinates: 56°10′N 14°41′E
- Country: Sweden
- Province: Blekinge
- County: Blekinge County
- Municipality: Sölvesborg Municipality and Karlshamn Municipality

Area
  - Total: 0.61 km^{2} (0.24 sq mi)

Population (31 December 2010)
  - Total: 279
  - Density: 459/km^{2} (1,190/sq mi)
- Time zone: UTC+1 (CET)
  - Summer (DST): UTC+2 (CEST)

Pukavik is a bimunicipal locality situated in Sölvesborg Municipality and Karlshamn Municipality in Blekinge County, Sweden with 279 inhabitants in 2010.

Of Pukavik's 279 inhabitants, 157 live in Sölvesborg Municipality and 126 in Karlshamn Municipality, both in Blekinge County.

Historically Pukavik served as a shipbuilding center, constructing trading vessels suited to the ice and storms of the Baltic.

Several noted wooden sailing vessels were built in Pukavik. These include:

- The Black Opal, 1909. Renamed The Black Pearl, has a long and varied history, including use in the movie Popeye; currently serving as a restaurant in a marina in Malta.
- Yngve, 1929; a three-masted schooner built of oak and pine. Renamed Lindö in 1939 and continued trading under Swedish flag until 1969. Sold in 1970 for re-rigging as three-masted topsail schooner named Lindø, for charter trade. Registered in Cayman Islands. Took part in the 1976 Tall Ships Race from Plymouth, UK, to USA. 1977 Sold to American owner, acquires US flag. 1978 used for the making of Peter Benchley's movie "The Island". Becomes roving ambassador for city of Alexandria, Virginia, in 1983 and name changed to Alexandria in 1984. Sold to private owner in September 1996 and foundered off Cape Hatteras on 9 December that year.
- Orion, 1945. Renamed S.V. Earl of Pembroke, an 18th-century 3 masted barque used in many films: Treasure Island, A Respectable Trade, Moll Flanders, Cutthroat Island, Frenchman's Creek, Shaka Zulu, Longitude, and Wives and Daughters.
