= Kantar (disambiguation) =

Kantar is the official Egyptian weight unit for measuring cotton.

Kantar may also refer to:

== Business ==
- Kantar Group, UK-based market research group
- Kantar Media, international market research firm
  - Kantar Media Philippines, Philippines market research firm specializing in broadcast media

== Persons ==
- Edwin Kantar (1932–2022), American bridge player
- Samir Kantar, also written Qantar, Kuntar, Quntar (born 1962), Lebanese Druze former member of the Palestine Liberation Front
- Selâhattin Kantar (1878–1949), Turkish archaeologist, museum director, journalist and playwright

== Places ==
- Kantar, Gercüş, a village in Gercüş District, Batman Province, Turkey
- Kantar, Nusaybin, a village in Nusaybin District, Mardin Province, Turkey

== See also ==
- Kantara (disambiguation)
- Qantara (disambiguation)
- Kandar (disambiguation)
- Kandara (disambiguation)
