= Aleksandria =

Aleksandria may refer to the following places:

- Aleksandria, Dobrich Province, Bulgaria
- Aleksandria, Łódź Voivodeship (central Poland)
- Aleksandria, Płońsk County in Masovian Voivodeship (east-central Poland)
- Aleksandria, Żyrardów County in Masovian Voivodeship (east-central Poland)
- Aleksandria, Greater Poland Voivodeship (west-central Poland)
- Aleksandria, Silesian Voivodeship (south Poland)

== See also ==
- Alexandria (disambiguation)
- Oleksandriia (disambiguation)
