= Alexandria metropolitan area =

The Alexandria metropolitan area may refer to:

- The Alexandria metropolitan area, Egypt
- The Alexandria, Louisiana metropolitan area, United States
- The Alexandria, Minnesota micropolitan area, United States

== See also ==
- Alexandria (disambiguation)
