= Gandhara (disambiguation) =

Gandhara was an ancient region in north-western South Asia, which existed until the 6th century CE.

Gandhara may also refer to:

- Gandhāra (mahajanapada), one of the 16 mahajanapadas
- Gandhara (Mahabharata), the kingdom as described in ancient Indian epics especially the Mahabharata
- Gandhara or Gandāra, an Achaemenid province in the region
- Gandhara grave culture, an archaeological culture from the 15–6th centuries BCE
- Greco-Buddhist art, also known as Gandhara art
- Gandhara University, a university in Pakistan
- Gandhara (moth), a genus of moths
- "Gandhara" (song), a song by Japanese rock band Godiego
- Gandhara (video game), a home computer game by Enix
- Gandhara or Kandahar, a city in Afghanistan
- Gandhara or Kandhara, a village in Odisha, India
- Gandhara or Gandarvakottai, a city in Tamil Nadu, India
- Gandhara (svara), the third note in the Indian classical music scale

== See also ==
- Gāndhārī (disambiguation)
- Gandharva (disambiguation)
- Gandara (disambiguation)
- Gandahar (disambiguation)
- Kandahar (disambiguation)
- Kandar (disambiguation)
- Kandara (disambiguation)
- Kandari (disambiguation)
- Gandha (disambiguation)
- Ganadhara, a concept in Jainism
