= Kandahari =

Kandahari may refer to:

- something or someone of, from, or related to Kandahar, a city in Afghanistan
- Southern Pashto, or Kandahari, a language of Afghanistan
- Kandahari rupee, former currency of Afghanistan
- Kandahari Begum (1593–?), Indian queen consort
- Kako Kandahari, Aghan detainee at Guantanamo

== See also ==
- Kandahar (disambiguation)
- Kandari (disambiguation)
- Gandhari (disambiguation)
- Kandhari, an Indian surname
- Qandahari, village in Baghlan, Afghanistan
- Boz Qandahari, village in Kunduz, Afghanistan, site of the Battle of Boz Qandahari
- Kandahari Bazar, market in Quetta, Pakistan, site of the 2023 Kandahari Bazar bombing
- Haji Dost Muhammad Qandhari (1801–1868), 19th-century Afghan Sufi saint
