= Battle of Kandahar =

Battle of Kandahar may refer to these battles in Kandahar, Afghanistan:

- Battle of Kandahar (1880), the last major conflict of the Second Anglo-Afghan War
- Battle of Kandahar (2001), the fall of the city in 2001, signaling the end of organized Taliban control of Afghanistan
- Battle of Kandahar (2011), an attack by the Taliban in May 2011
- Battle of Kandahar (2021), part of the 2021 Taliban offensive

== See also ==
- Kandahar (disambiguation)
- Siege of Kandahar (1605–1606)
- Siege of Kandahar (1648–1649)
- Siege of Kandahar (1737–1738)
- Siege of Kandahar (1834)
