= Gandharva (disambiguation) =

Gandharva is a mythological creature in Hinduism and Buddhism.

Gandharva may also refer to:

== Surname ==
- Bal Gandharva (1888–1967), 20th-century Indian theatre personality
- Sawai Gandharva, a Hindustani classical vocalist
- Kumar Gandharva, a Hindustani classical vocalist

== Other uses ==
- Gandharva marriage, a historic marriage tradition from the Indian subcontinent
- Gandharva (album), a 1971 electronica album by Beaver & Krause
- The Gandharvas, a rock band from Canada
- Gandharva Mahavidyalaya (established 1939), a music school in New Delhi
- Gandarbha, an ethnic group in Nepal
- Gandharv, a Hindu community in North India
- Gandharva (film), a 1992 Kannada film starring Soundarya

== See also ==
- Ganadhara, a concept in Jainism
- Gandarvakottai, in Tamil Nadu, India
- Gaandharvam, a 1978 Indian film
- Gandhara (disambiguation)
