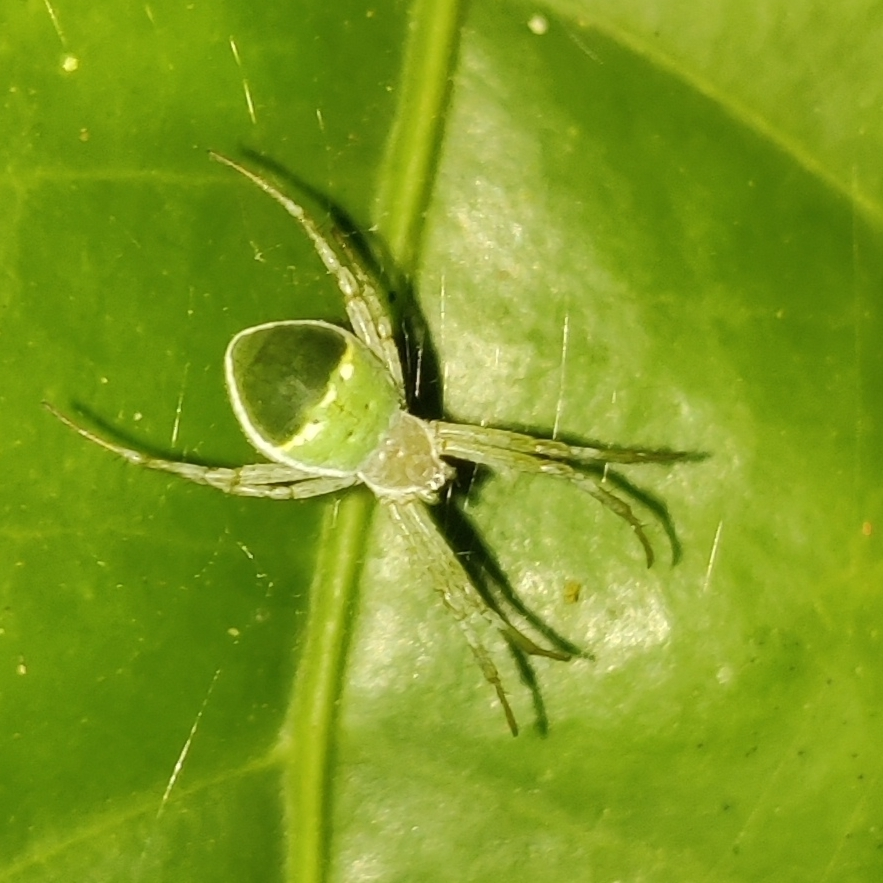
- female from Borneo

Scientific classification
- Kingdom: Animalia
- Phylum: Arthropoda
- Subphylum: Chelicerata
- Class: Arachnida
- Order: Araneae
- Infraorder: Araneomorphae
- Family: Araneidae
- Genus: Argiope
- Species: A. chloreis

Binomial name
- Argiope chloreis Thorell, 1877

Synonyms
- Argiope pumila Thorell, 1890

= Argiope chloreis =

Green Argiope

Species of orb-weaver spider

Argiope chloreis is a species of orb-weaver spider in the family Araneidae. It was first described by Swedish arachnologist Tamerlan Thorell in 1877.

== Distribution ==
A. chloreis is found across Southeast Asia, with confirmed records from China, Malaysia (peninsula and Borneo), and Indonesia (Sumatra and Sulawesi).

== Description ==
According to the original description by Thorell, A. chloreis is a medium-sized orb-weaver with distinctive coloration. The cephalothorax and legs have a greenish-pale (virescens) appearance with dense whitish pubescence. The eyes are black, and the sternum shows a large whitish patch with greenish margins.

The legs are pale greenish with silvery-pubescent appearance, equipped with spines and setae. The first and second pairs of legs are approximately equal in length, being about 4.5 times longer than the cephalothorax, while legs are not much longer than the fourth pair.

The abdomen is described as pale greenish-gray or whitish, with sparse silvery pubescence. It features 6-8 black spots arranged in two regular series, with a thin longitudinal line between them. The abdomen also displays several rounded dark olive-brown spots with whitish borders, creating a distinctive pattern across the dorsal surface.

== Taxonomy ==
Argiope chloreis was originally described from a single female specimen collected at Kandari by O. Beccari. The species was later synonymized with Argiope pumila Thorell, 1890 by Levi in 1983, but this synonymy has been subject to revision based on morphological and molecular evidence.
