= Kandhari =

Kandhari is an Indian (Khatri) toponymic surname indicating association with Kandahar province, Afghanistan.

== Notable people ==
Notable people with the surname are include:

- Harjeev Kandhari (born 1975), Indian entrepreneur
- Karan Kandhari, Indian film director
- LK Kandhari (1931–1971), Indian cricketer
- Rishina Kandhari, Indian TV actress

== Other uses ==
- Red Kandhari, breed of cattle native to Kandhar, Maharashtra, India
- Burj Kandhari, village in Punjab, India

== See also ==
- Qandhari, a region in Pakistan
- Kandahari (disambiguation)
- Kandari (disambiguation)
- Gandhari (disambiguation)
