= Frankness (disambiguation) =

Frankness is the state of being honest.

Frankness may also refer to:

== Literature ==
- Otsekohesus (Frankness; 1921), a novella by Hendrik Saar, Estonian journalist, caricaturist, playwright, and clown.
- "Frankness" (1843), a short story in The Mayflower; or, Sketches of Scenes and Characters among the Descendants of the Pilgrims by Harriet Beecher Stowe, American author and abolitionist.
- "Frankness" (2001), a chapter in The Meaning of Things by A. C. Grayling, British philosopher and author.

== Music ==
- Frankness (2004),an album by Mara, Russian rock singer, musician, and songwriter.
- "Zakkubaran (Frankness) (ざっくばらん)", a song by Appa, Japanese rock.

== See also ==
- Candor (disambiguation)
