= Teciem =

British financial Software company

teciem
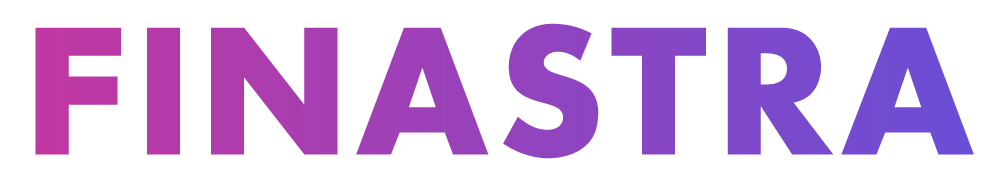
- Type: Private
- Industry: Information technology
- Predecessors: Finastra, Misys, D+H
- Founded: 2026; 0 years ago
- Headquarters: London, England, United Kingdom
- Key people: Wissam Khoury
- Products: Financial software (Kondor, Summit, Opics, Sophis, Sophis Invest, Arc)
- Owner: Apax Partners
- Number of employees: 1,300+ (2026)
- Website: teciem.com

Finastra is a British financial software company headquartered in London The company sells software for retail banking, transaction banking, lending, and treasury capital markets.

Teciem has 1,300 employees in 85 pays.

Teciem is pronounced /tiːsiːɛm/, like the acronym TCM (Treasury Capital Market), and is usually written in lowercase.

== History ==
In February 2026, Vista Equity Partners sold Finastra's BusinessUnit TCM (Treasury Capital Market) to the company Apax Partners. Apax Partners made TCM an independent company called teciem (pronounced like acronym TCM) · · .

Although recently established, teciem and its software have, in fact, already existed for 35 years under other names.

== Software as editor ==
Teciem develops in 2026, six software:

- Kondor:
  - The comprehensive, real time treasury solution. Kondor by Teciem is used by banks to centralize and manage liquidity, funding, trading and risk across FX, money markets, interest rates and derivatives. A single, integrated, front-to-back platform for all treasury operations.
- Summit
  - Capital markets platform for banks’ digital transformation. Summit by Teciem is specifically designed for the OTC derivatives market, supporting business growth, improving STP.
- Opics
  - A simplified treasury solution, delivering transparency, flexibility and functionality on a single platform for cost-effective growth.
- Sophis
  - A unified platform for pricing, trading and managing equity and commodity derivatives – with transparent risk and automated processing built in. Sophis by Teciem delivers pricing, hedging and seamless lifecycle management for investment banks’ trading desks, structured products and hedging solution providers, and cross-asset regional banks.
- Sophis Invest
- Arc

== Software as a Service ==
- Kondor up
  - Treasury as a Service. Kondor Up delivers Kondor's front-to-back treasury capabilities through the cloud-native operating model.
