= Alessandria (disambiguation) =

Alessandria may refer to three towns in Italy and various things related to them

- Alessandria, a town in Piedmont
  - U.S. Alessandria Calcio 1912, Alessandria's football club
  - Roman Catholic Diocese of Alessandria della Paglia, the Roman Catholic diocese centred on Alessandria
  - The Province of Alessandria, the Italian province with Alessandria as its capital
- Alessandria del Carretto, a town in the province of Cosenza in Calabria
- Alessandria della Rocca, a small agricultural town in Sicily
- Alessandria (meteorite), a meteorite which fell in 1860 near Alessandria, Piedmont, Italy

== People with the surname ==
- Arnaud Alessandria (born 1993), Monegasque alpine skier
- Lucas Alessandría (born 1978), Argentine footballer

== See also ==
- Alexandria (disambiguation)
- Kandahar (disambiguation)
- Sikandarabad (disambiguation)
