= Earl of Pembroke (tall ship) =

1945 sailing ship

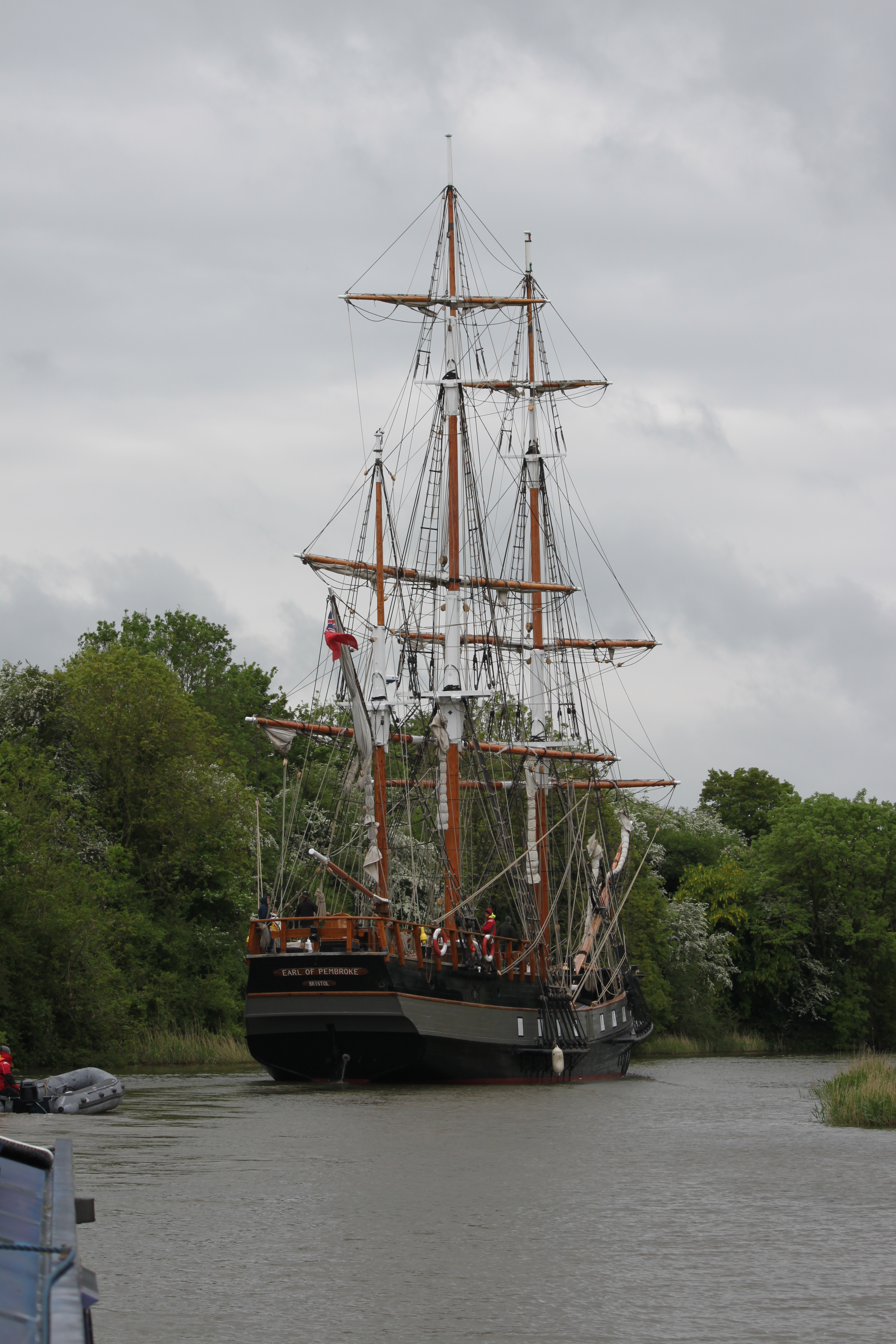
- Earl of Pembroke in the Gloucester and Sharpness Canal in 2016

History

Sweden
- Name: Orion
- Owner: Rederi AB Tellus (mngr Arthur Wingren) (1945-)
- Port of registry: Oskarshamn, Sweden
- Builder: Albert Svenson, Pukavik, Sweden
- Launched: 1945

Denmark
- Name: Tullan
- Owner: N/A
- Acquired: 1949
- Decommissioned: 1979
- Renamed: 1949

United Kingdom
- Name: Earl of Pembroke
- Owner: R. Davies (1979-2012); Metaco LLP (2012-2017); Scarlet Sails LTD (2017-2022)
- Identification: MMSI number: 234999080; Callsign: MSTY8
- Fate: Scrapped 2022

General characteristics
- Class & type: Barque
- Tonnage: 178 tons GRT; 352t displacement
- Length: LOA 44.2m (145 ft)
- Beam: 7.3 m (24 ft)
- Draught: 3.20 m (10.5 ft)
- Propulsion: Engine 6-cylinder, turbo diesel, 405 hp
- Sail plan: 885 square m (9500 square ft)
- Complement: Crew of 15
- Notes: up to 50 pass. for day trips, up to 12 pass. overnight

Earl of Pembroke was a wooden, three-masted barque, which was frequently used for maritime festivals, charters, charity fund raising, corporate entertaining and film work.

== History ==
=== Early years ===
Earl of Pembroke was built in Pukavik, Sweden as Orion in 1945 and used to haul timber in the Baltic Sea until 1974 when she was laid up in Thisted, Denmark.

=== Restoration ===
She was moved to the UK in 1980 where her full restoration began in 1985. As part of the restoration, her rig was changed from the original schooner to barque type (to resemble the famous HMS Endeavour on which Captain Cook discovered Australia) and she was renamed Earl of Pembroke (HMS Endeavour was called Earl of Pembroke when she worked as a coal trader in the West Country).

The restoration was designed with festivals and film work in mind. The three-masted rig and the uninterrupted decks containing no superstructure or wheelhouse create the silhouette of a classic sailing ship so she needs only minimal work to get a period correct aerial or side shot. With some effort she can also be made to look like an old Spanish Galleon or steam-sailing ship from the age of the Arctic expeditions.

=== Post restoration (festivals and film) ===
Following restoration Earl of Pembroke was used in the production of films and attended a number of festivals including:

- Brest Maritime Festival 2012
- Milford Haven Festival - Seafair Heaven
- Gloucester Maritime Festival 2015
- Southampton Boat Show 2015
- Belfast Titanic Maritime Festival 2016
- DelfSail 2016
- Dublin River Festival 2016
- London, UK - Sail Royal Greenwich 2016, 2017
- Drogheda Maritime Festival 2017
- Liverpool Maritime Festival 2017

She was used in the following films:

- Hornblower Series III
- Treasure Island
- A Respectable Trade
- Moll Flanders
- Beaumarchais, l'insolent
- Mary Reilly
- Cutthroat Island
- Shipwrecked
- Frenchman's Creek
- Shaka Zulu
- Longitude
- Wives and Daughters
- Count of Monte-Cristo
- L'Épervier, French television series
- Alice in Wonderland (2010 film)
- Cloud Atlas
- Alice in Wonderland: Through the Looking Glass
- Le Pacte des Loups (Brotherhood of the Wolf)

=== Final destination ===
Scrapped at Hoeben RDM Schepen in Kampen, on 2 December 2022

=== Sail Plan ===
1. Mizzen 35.8
2. Mizzen Staysail 19.9
3. Mizzen Topmast Staysail 29.8
4. Maincourse 86.6
5. Main Topsail 101.3
6. Main Topgallant 45.6
7. Main Staysail 40.6
8. Main Topmast Staysail 46.8
9. Main Topgallant Staysail 37.7
10. Forecourse 54.3
11. Fore Topsail 89.6
12. Fore Topgallant 44.9
13. Inner JIB 25.9
14. Outer JIB 29.0

Total sail area: 689 m2.

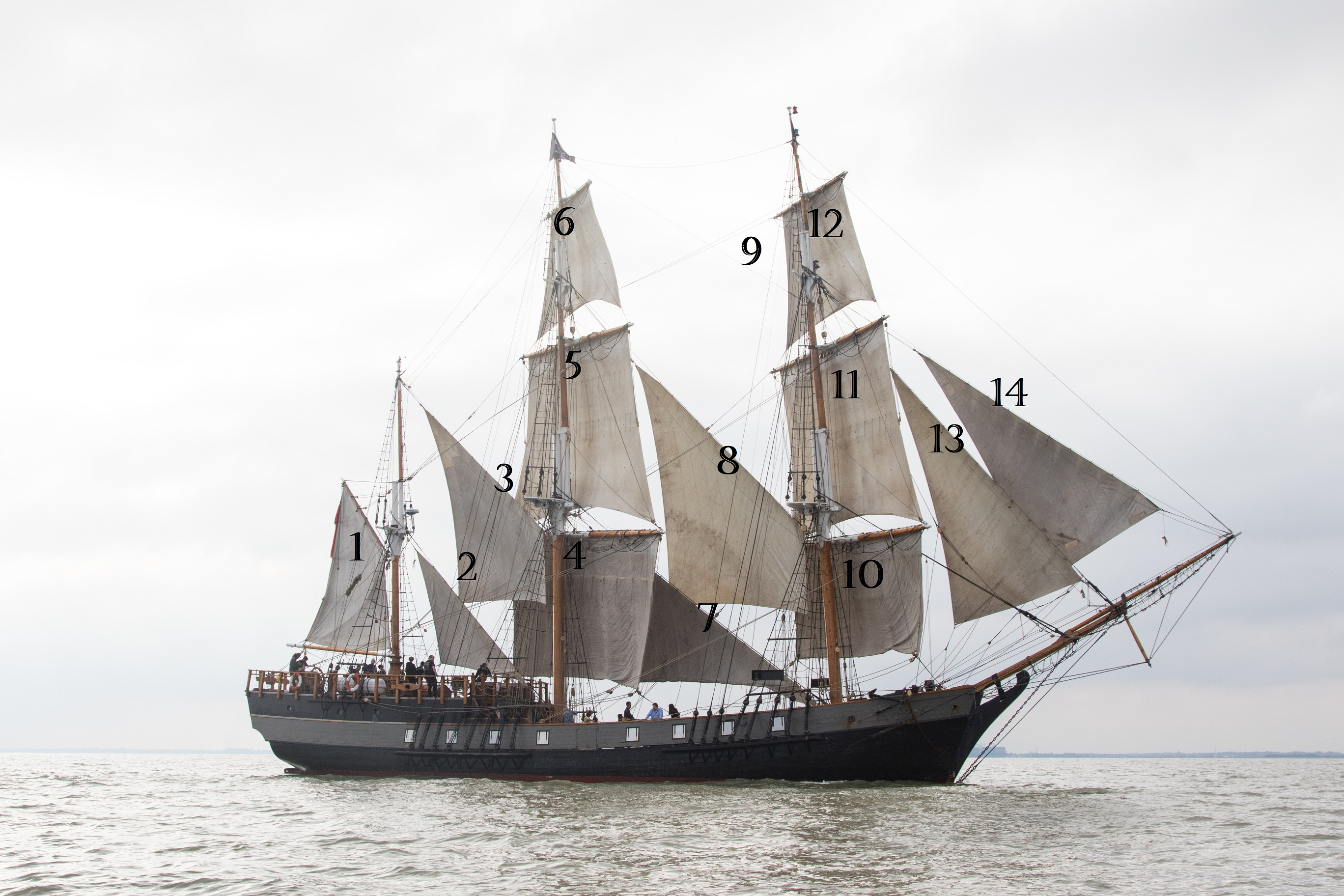
Earl of Pembroke sail plan

== Gallery ==
Earl of Pembroke in Gloucester Docks (2014)
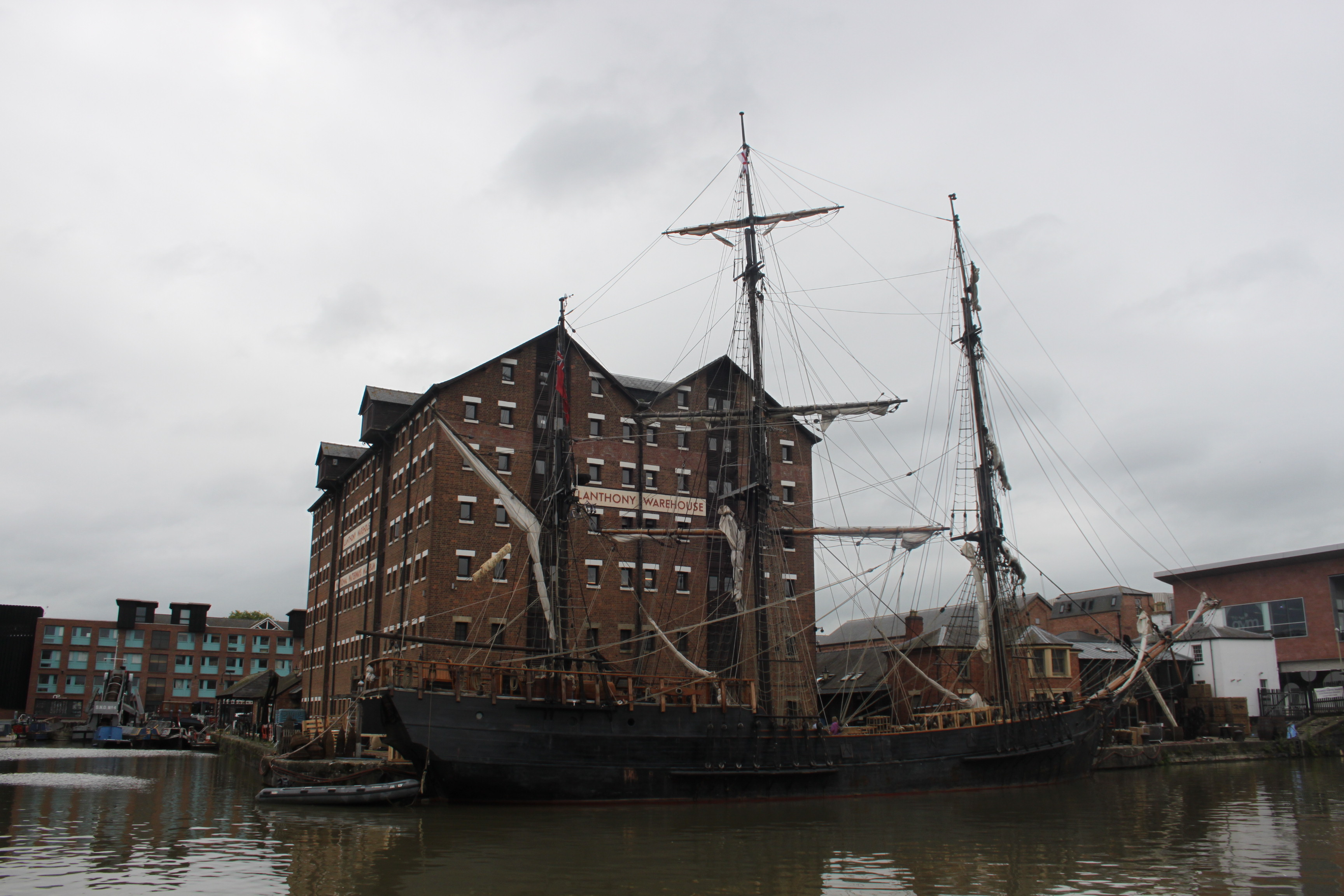
EOP during filming Alice in Wonderland Through the Looking in Gloucester

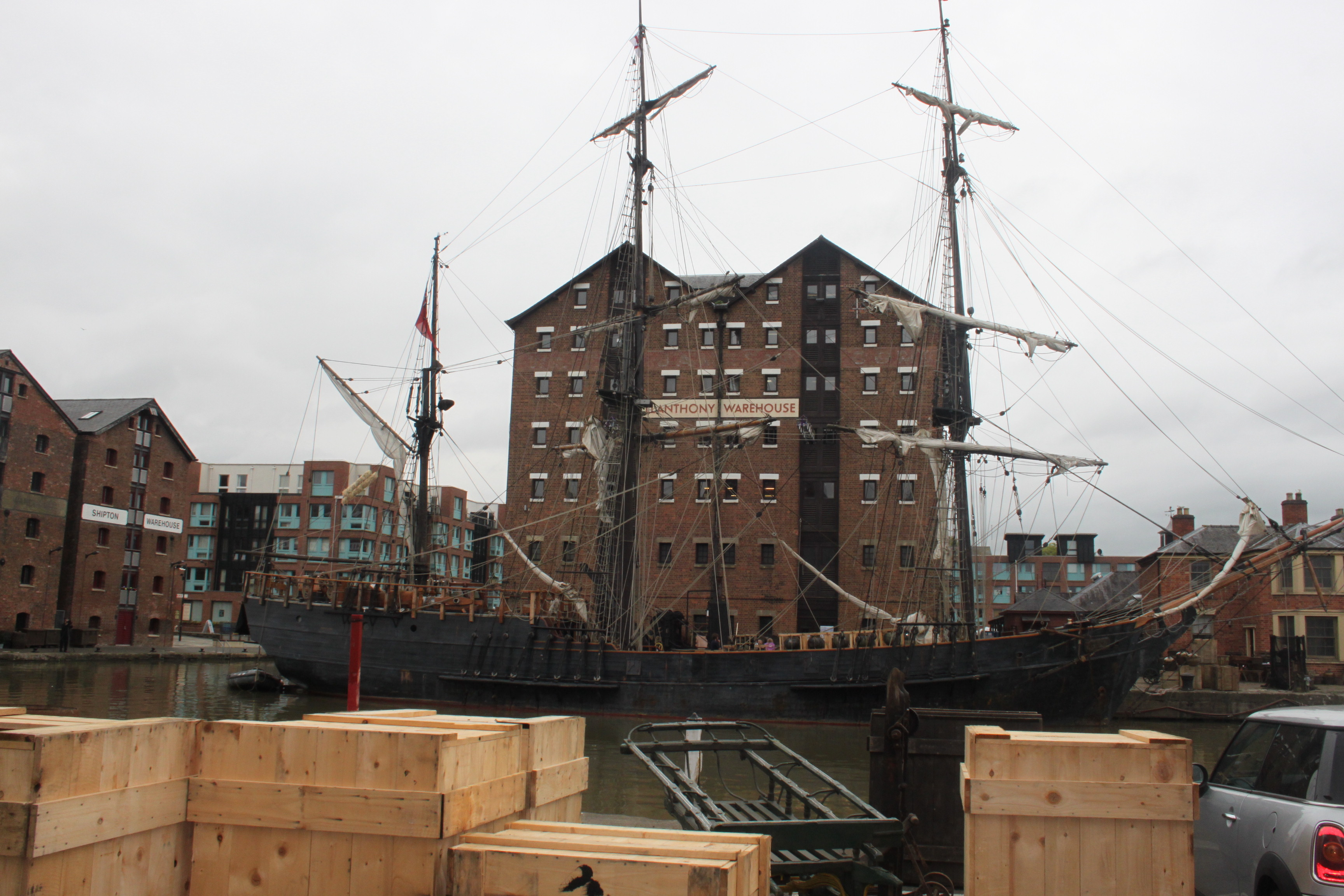
EOP during filming Alice in Wonderland Through the Looking in Gloucester

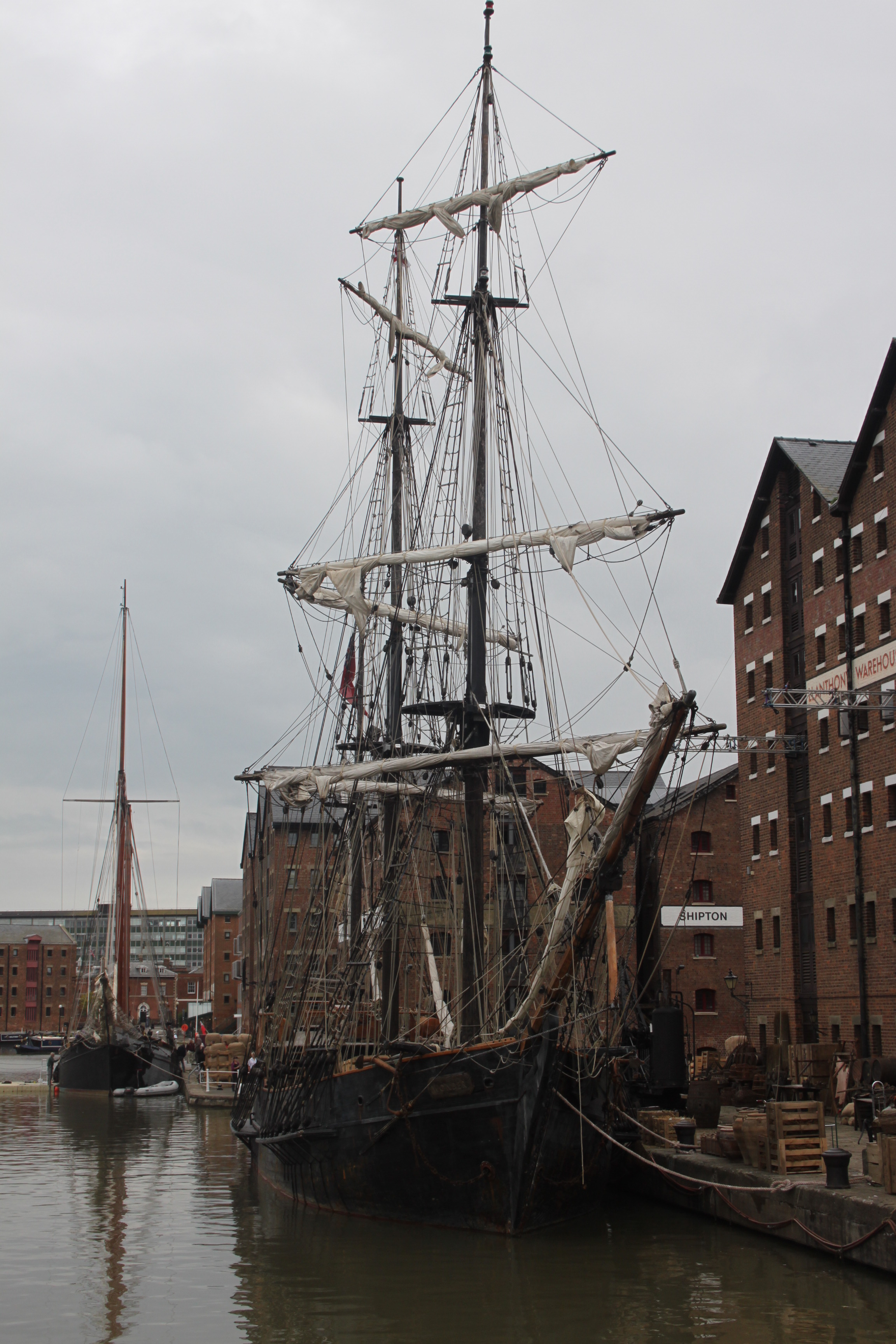
EOP during filming Alice in Wonderland Through the Looking in Gloucester

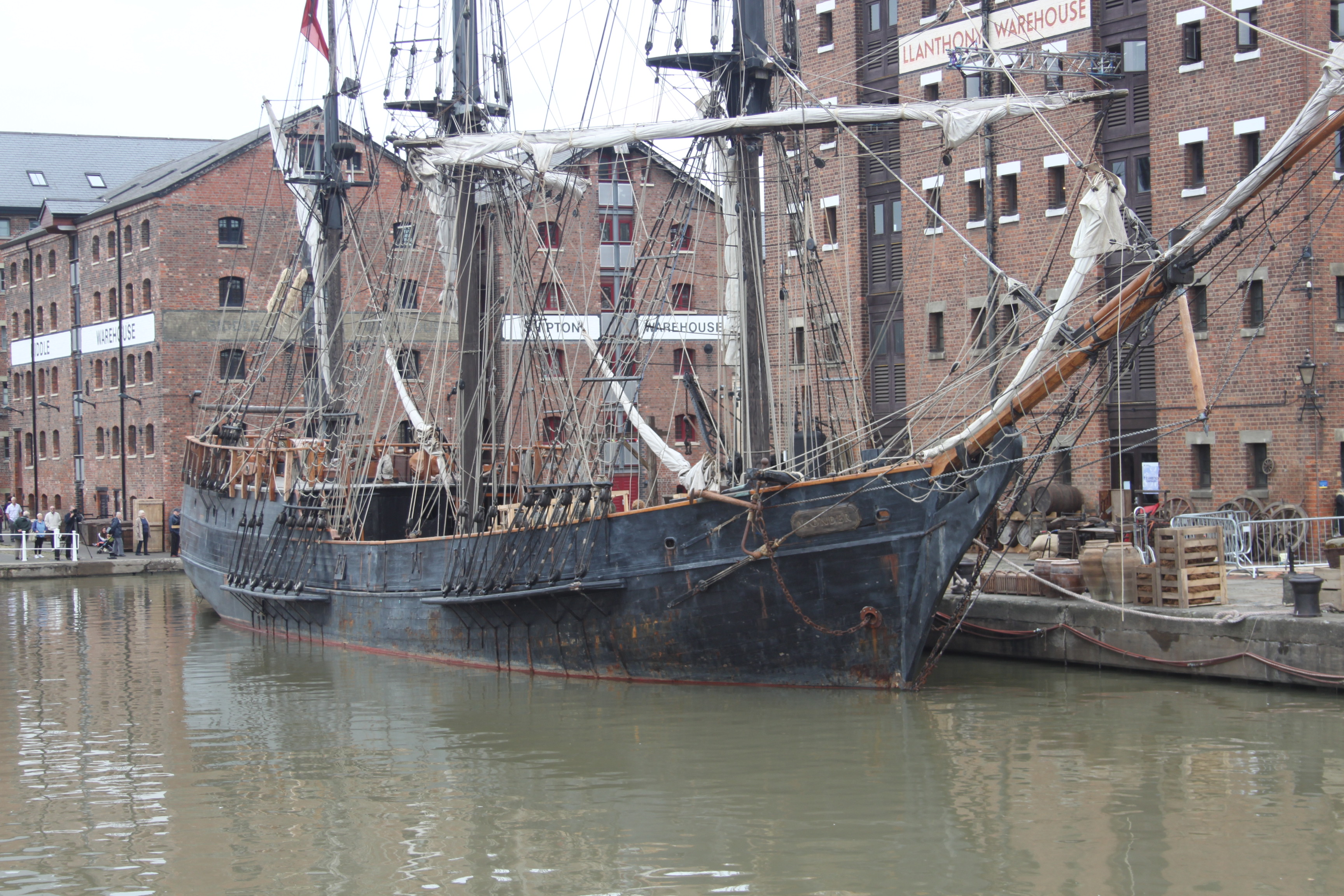
EOP during filming Alice in Wonderland Through the Looking in Gloucester

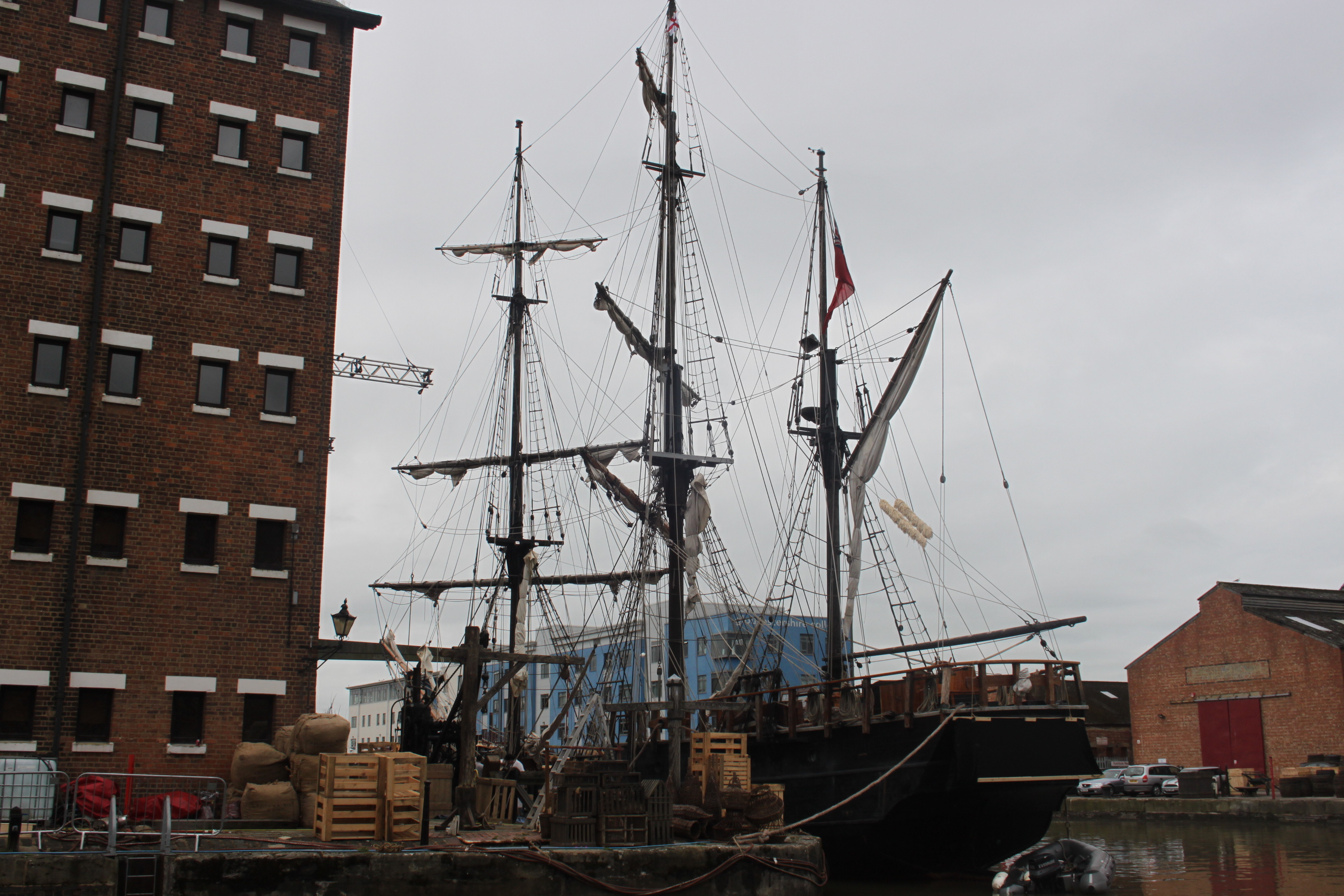
EOP during filming Alice in Wonderland Through the Looking in Gloucester
