= Zarat, Ismailli =

Zarat
- Location within Azerbaijan
- Coordinates: 40°55′35″N 48°24′31″E
- Country: Azerbaijan
- Rayon: Ismailli
- Municipality: Çəndahar
- Time zone: UTC+4 (AZT)
  - Summer (DST): UTC+5 (AZT)

Zarat (also, Zaratbaba-Deresi) is a village in the Ismailli Rayon of Azerbaijan. The village forms part of the municipality of Çandahar.
