= Candor =

Candor or candour may refer to:

- Candor or parrhesia, the quality of speaking candidly in rhetoric
- Candour (magazine), a British far-right magazine
- "Candour", a song by Neck Deep from their 2014 album Wishful Thinking
- Duty of candour, a concept in British law
- Candor, a 2009 speculative fiction novel by Pam Bachorz

== Towns ==
- Candor, New York, a town.
- Candor (village), New York, a village within the town.
- Candor, North Carolina.
- Candor, Oise, France.

== See also ==
- Candor, one of the five factions in the Divergent series by Veronica Roth
- Kandor (disambiguation)
- Frankness (disambiguation)
