= Alexandria Station =

Alexandria Station may refer to:

- Alexandria station (Minnesota), Alexandria, Minnesota, United States
- Alexandria railway station (Scotland), Alexandria, Scotland, United Kingdom
- Alexandria railway station (Ontario), Alexandria, Ontario, Canada
- Alexandria Union Station, Alexandria, Virginia, United States
- Alexandria Station (Northern Territory), a cattle station in Northern Territory, Australia
- Alexandria railway station (Egypt), Alexandria, Egypt
