= Gandahar =

Gandahar may refer to:

- Gandahar (film), 1987 French animated film, also known as Light Years
- Çandahar, village in Azerbaijan
- Gandhara, an ancient kingdom once located in eastern Afghanistan and northwestern Pakistan

== See also ==
- Gandhara (disambiguation)
- Kandahar (disambiguation)
