= Kandor =

Kandor may refer to:

- Kandor, Hamadan, Iran
- Kandor (comics), a city in DC Comics
- Kandor, a country in The Wheel of Time series
- Kandor Graphics, Spanish animation studio

== See also ==
- Candor (disambiguation)
- Kandar (disambiguation)
- Kondar (disambiguation)
- Kondor (disambiguation)
