= Lameck Mokoena =

South African politician and traditional leader (born 1957)

Delegate to the National Council of Provinces

Assembly Member for Limpopo
- In office June 1999 – May 2009

Member of the National Assembly
- In office May 1994 – June 1999

Personal details
- Born: Mathupa Lameck Mokoena; 23 March 1957 (age 69)
- Citizenship: South Africa
- Party: African National Congress

Mathupa Lameck Mokoena (born 23 March 1957) is a South African politician and traditional leader who is currently the chairperson of the Mpumalanga House of Traditional Leaders and the national president of the Congress of Traditional Leaders of South Africa (Contralesa). The leader of Mpumalanga's Mathibela Tribal Authority, he represented the African National Congress (ANC) in Parliament from 1994 to 2009.

== Traditional leadership ==
Born on 23 March 1957, Mokoena is the leader of the Mathibela Tribal Authority in Bushbuckridge Local Municipality, Mpumalanga. He served as chairperson of the Mpumalanga House of Traditional Leaders from 2012 to 2017, when he was succeeded by Sandile Ngomane; he returned to the same office at the conclusion of Ngomane's term in 2022.

Mokoena is also the president of Contralesa. In that capacity, he was a firm opponent of the Customary Initiation Bill, an attempt by Parliament to regulate customary initiation schools; among other things, he objected to the inclusion of women on the proposed oversight committees, which he said would be "to us Africans... an insult".

== Legislative career ==
Mokoena was elected to represent the ANC in the National Assembly in the 1994 general election, South Africa's first under universal suffrage. In the next general election in 1999, he was elected to an ANC seat in the National Council of Provinces; he served the constituency of Limpopo, which at the time was called the Northern Province and was inclusive of Bushbuckridge. He served two terms in the National Council of Provinces, gaining re-election in 2004.
