= Gandha =

Gandha (the Hindi or Sanskrit word गंध; meaning smell or fragrance) may refer to:

- Gandha (film), a 2009 Indian Marathi-language film
- Gandha Mardhan hills, is a hill in Odisha

== See also ==
- Gandhi (disambiguation)
- Gandhara (disambiguation)
- Sugandha (disambiguation)
- Gandha-Woundou, a town in northern Guinea
