= Kondoreh =

Kondoreh كندره
- Village
- Location within Iran
- Coordinates: 36°46′51″N 45°15′28″E
- Country: Iran
- Province: West Azerbaijan
- County: Piranshahr
- Bakhsh: Lajan
- Rural District: Lahijan-e Sharqi

Population (2006)
  - Total: 227
- Time zone: UTC+3:30 (IRST)
  - Summer (DST): UTC+4:30 (IRDT)

Kondoreh (Persian: كندره; also known as Kondor) is a village in Lahijan-e Sharqi Rural District, Lajan District, Piranshahr County, West Azerbaijan Province, Iran. At the 2006 census, its population was 227, in 39 families.
