= Battle of Kandahar (2011) =

2011 battle in Afghanistan

- Part of the War in Afghanistan (2001–2021)
Date	May 7–9, 2011
Location	Kandahar, Afghanistan
Result	Afghan government victory

Belligerents
Afghanistan	Taliban

Commanders and leaders
Unknown	Unknown, captured

Strength
80+ policemen	40–100 insurgents

Casualties and losses
8 killed 4 wounded 6 killed in separate assault*	Per ISAF; 25 killed 7 captured
- 4 civilians killed 50 civilians wounded
- Six police officers were killed in a separate assault that was grouped into the larger Battle of Kandahar.

The Battle of Kandahar was an attack by Taliban forces on May 7, 2011, in the city of Kandahar. The battle was the biggest Taliban offensive of 2011, marking over 40 total deaths and over 50 total wounded. The fighting demonstrated that, despite heavy losses since 2001, the Taliban forces remain a threat to coalition and Afghan forces, and show that morale in insurgent groups has not died since the killing of Osama bin Laden.

== Background ==
Kandahar was known to have high insurgent levels. To push them out of Kandahar, in 2010 NATO and the US began a year-long campaign to push the Taliban and al-Qaeda out of Kandahar. Though a success, Kandahar still has insurgents in the city, though less than before.

== Battle ==
Early in the morning, 40–60 (Taliban claim 200) militants used rocket-propelled grenades, guns and other weapons to attack the governor's office from nearby buildings. The Taliban then proceeded and attacked many more places, including outposts, police buildings and local offices. In most of the attacks, suicide bombers were used, though militants armed with guns also took part in the attack. In the suicide bombings, 4 civilians were killed and 50 wounded.

Though fighting died down overnight, militants continued to attack throughout Sunday in a couple of abandoned buildings. The first casualty reports were released Sunday. AFP reported that there were 12 insurgents killed and seven captured, but AP quoted that Interior Ministry spokesman saying 23 attackers were killed, including eight that had suicide vests on. The battle continued for two days before Afghan police confirmed that most, or all, Taliban forces are out of Kandahar.

On Sunday, Afghan police forced a little over two dozen Taliban militants back into a hotel, where Afghan police opened fire from rooftops. They killed over 20 until it came down to the last two. One of them was killed by gunfire, while the other one, wearing a suicide vest, blew himself up in the building, refusing to surrender. The Afghan Police and Security Forces effectively ended a majority of the battle. But, there continues to be minor amounts of Taliban inside the city.

== Aftermath ==
The first casualty reports were released Saturday. AFP reported that there were 12 insurgents killed and seven captured, but AP quoted that Interior Ministry spokesman saying 23 attackers were killed, including eight that had suicide vests on. Six police officers were killed and 4 wounded in the attack, and another 6 were killed in a separate attack in which police hit a roadside bomb and then were attacked by gunfire afterwards. In the Aftermath, a report by BBC said that civilians were too scared to go in or out of Kandahar. Two Afghan Security forces were killed.

Taliban said that they had 100 militants in the city, but NATO claims there were only 40–60. However, neither of these numbers were confirmed, and the exact number remains unknown. It is thought that many of the fighters in the attack were escapees from the Kandahar prison escape, because they were nearby and experienced fighters. If so, then the number of Taliban in/around Kandahar could be up to 500–600 militants. "We have fighters at every corner and Kandahar is surrounded," Qari Yousuf Ahmadi said to AP reporters, by phone, though NATO doubted that there could be that many fighters in the city, since Taliban has been known to exaggerate numbers.

At first, the attacks were believed to have been done in revenge of the Osama Bin Laden killing, though Taliban spokesperson Qari Yousuf Ahmadi denied this claim, saying: "A number of fighters are in several locations around the city. These are not retaliatory attacks for the death of Osama bin Laden but are part of our spring offensive."
