= Qanater, Hama Governorate =

Qanater القناطر
- Village
- Location in Syria
- Country: Syria
- Governorate: Hama
- District: Hama District
- Subdistrict: Al-Hamraa Nahiyah

Population (2004)
  - Total: 256
- Time zone: UTC+3 (AST)
- City Qrya Pcode: C3095

Qanater (Arabic: القناطر) is a Syrian village located in Al-Hamraa Nahiyah in Hama District, Hama. According to the Syria Central Bureau of Statistics (CBS), Qanater had a population of 256 in the 2004 census.
