= Maraguda =

Coordinates: 20.729985°N 82.460819°E

Maraguda valley (82.28'E an d20.43'N) is located at the Sunabeda Plateau, Nuapada district. In particular, it is located at the historical and cultural junction of Magadha, Madhya Pradesh, Deccan and Odisha.

== History ==
This place is of great historical significance as there are ongoing explorations and excavations of the exuberant city ruins with unprecedented socio-religious connotation of early Indian city civilisation having excellent religious institutions, magnificent residential apartments, massive fortification and efflorescent palace complex, as the majestic imperial metropolis with acropolis and seat of cultural culmination of Kosal kingdom.

During the Puranic period, this region was known to be part of Nishadha Kingdom. In the Mahabharata and Ramayana it was known as Kantara or Mahakantara which later on finds mention in the historical record of Allahabad pillaring scription of Samudragupta. Mahabharata has not specified the location of Nishadha, but has referred to its capital Giriprastha which seems to have been the Maraguda valley. It is also found that this area is mentioned as Atabika territory in the rock edict of Ashok. In the Hathigumpha inscription of Kharavela this part was called Vidhyadharadhivasa and was famous as a military recruiting centre. In the Satavahana record, it's mentioned as Mahabana. It formed part of Asmaka Mahajanapada in the early Buddhist list of Sodasamahajanapadas of Anguttaranikaya.

In the Seravanijia Jataka this place was known as a brisk trade centre. During the mythological period it was part of Dandakaranya, Daruvana and Tapovana. Many Saivacharya and sages of hoary fame hailed from Tapovana of this part. Subsequently the region came to be known as Kosal Kingdom in the early historical period. With the rise of the illustrious and mighty Nala rulers in the 3rd century A.D. Maraguda valley emerged as the classic city of Kosal and thrived for centuries with prosperity. The valley was fortunate in having a wonderful landscape of hills and dales quite befitting to nourish a rich civilisation as revealed by recent excavations corroborated by Hiuen Tsang's travel account. Many scholars have identified the site as capital city of Kosal Kingdom referred to by Hiuen Tsang. Of late, painstaking researches have further testified its identification, yet it remains contested with Shripura. Hiuen Tsang who extensively traveled in India from 630-645 A.D. The soil of the country was rich and fertile, the towns and villages were closed together, the people were prosperous, tall of stature and black in colour and the ruling king was a Kshatriya by birth. He further refers to Po-Lo-Mo-Lo-Ki-Li or Gandhmardan hill 300 li to the south-west of capital city. In the light of the reference of the Chinese pilgrim, Maraguda valley has been identified as the capital city of Mahakantara. The Nala king Viruparaja was most likely ruling at the time of his visit, as shown by many scholars.
