= Alexandria, Rio Grande do Norte =

Municipality in Rio Grande do Norte, Brazil

Alexandria
- Municipality
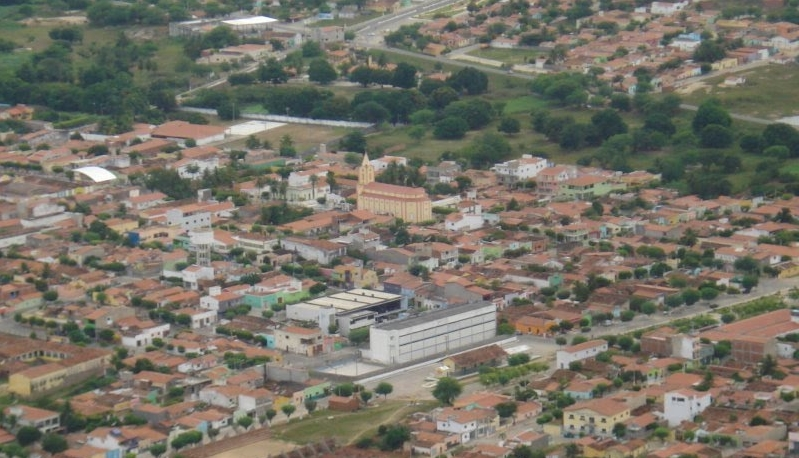

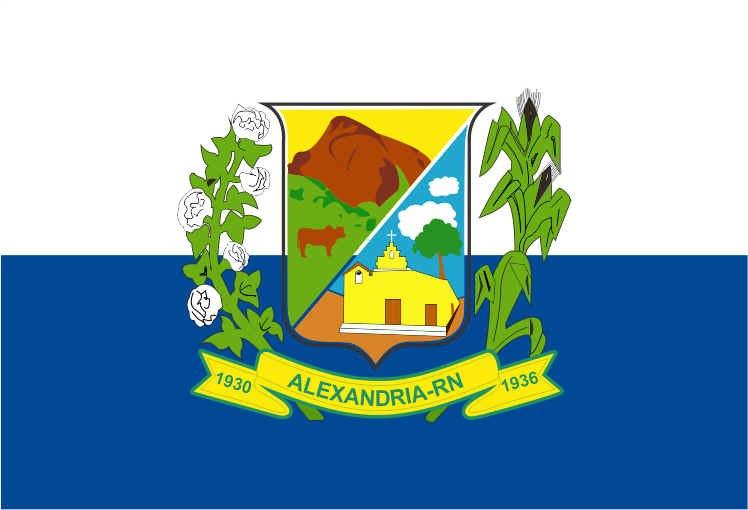
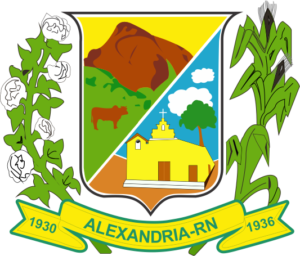
- Flag Coat of arms
- Motto: "Serra da Barriguda"
- Coordinates: 6°24′46″N 38°00′57″E
- Country: Brazil
- Region: Nordeste
- State: Rio Grande do Norte
- Mesoregion: Oeste Potiguar

Population (2020)
  - Total: 13,553
- Time zone: UTC -3

Alexandria is a municipality in the state of Rio Grande do Norte in the Northeast region of Brazil. With an area of 381.205 square kilometers (147.184 sq mi), of which 3.0631 square kilometres (1.1827 sq mi) is urban, it is located 317 km from Natal, the state capital, and 1,502 km from Brasília, the federal capital. Its population in the 2022 demographic census was 13,640 inhabitants, according to the Brazilian Institute of Geography and Statistics (IBGE), ranking as the 37th most populous municipality in the state of Rio Grande do Norte.

== Geography ==
The territory of Alexandria covers 381.205 square kilometers (147.184 sq mi), of which 3.0631 square kilometres (1.1827 sq mi) constitutes the urban area. It sits at an average altitude of 319 meters above sea level. The city is located 317 km from the state capital Natal, and 1,502 km from the federal capital Brasília.

Under the territorial division established in 2017 by the Brazilian Institute of Geography and Statistics (IBGE), the municipality belongs to the immediate geographical region of Pau dos Ferros, within the intermediate region of Mossoró. Previously, under the microregion and mesoregion divisions, it was part of the microregion of Serra de São Miguel in the mesoregion of Oeste Potiguar.

== Demographics ==
In the 2022 census, the municipality had a population of 13,640 inhabitants and ranked only 37th in the state that year (out of 167 municipalities), with 51.15% female and 48.85% male, resulting in a sex ratio of 95.50 (9,550 men for every 10,000 women), compared to 13,507 inhabitants in the 2010 census (68.03% living in the urban area), when it held the 150th state position. Between the 2010 and 2022 censuses, the population of Alexandria changed at an annual geometric growth rate of 0.08%. Regarding age group in the 2022 census, 67.47% of the inhabitants were between 15 and 64 years old, 18.25% were under fifteen, and 14.27% were 65 or older. The population density in 2022 was 35.78 inhabitants per square kilometer, with an average of 2.81 inhabitants per household.

The municipality's Human Development Index (HDI-M) is considered medium, according to data from the United Nations Development Programme. According to the 2010 report published in 2013, its value was 0.606, ranking 87th in the state and 3,999th nationally (out of 5,565 municipalities), and the Gini coefficient rose from 0.39 in 2003 to 0.54 in 2010. Considering only the longevity index, its value is 0.779, the income index is 0.581, and the education index is 0.491.

== See also ==
- List of municipalities in Rio Grande do Norte
