= Mago Orona Gándara =

Chicana artist (1929–2018)

- Born: February 8, 1929
- Died: February 18, 2018 (aged 89); El Paso, Texas, US
- Education: University of Texas at El Paso: Art Institute of Chicago; Antioch University
- Known for: Murals

Margarita "Mago" Orona Gándara (February 8, 1929 – February 18, 2018) was a Chicana artist. She is known for her murals which can be seen throughout El Paso, Texas and in Ciudad Juárez.

== Biography ==
Orona Gándara was born and raised in El Paso, Texas. Her nickname, "Mago," means "magician" in Spanish. She was a graduate of the University of Texas at El Paso (UTEP) and then went on to teach art at Bowie High School. In 1949, she saved $1,000 to go and study at the Art Institute of Chicago. She attended the Chouinard Art Institute. Orona Gándara also studied with Urbici Soler. When Orona Gándara was twenty-one, she got married and had five children. For many years, she followed her husband in his career, only separating after twenty-one years to pursue her own art career.

Orona Gándara returned to El Paso in late 1971 after living in California for around twenty years. She began teaching classes at the El Paso Museum of Art and opened her own art studio. Orona Gándara also began teaching at the El Paso Community College (EPCC). A mural project she did for EPCC became part of her master's degree from Antioch University.

She also opened an art studio in Juárez with help from her daughter who lent her the money for the home and studio. In the state of Chihuahua, Orona Gándara was considered an "art queen." She also attempted to make a difference in the colonia she lived in, Colonia Libertad, using art and murals. She left Juárez in 2011 when there was a large amount of violence in the city and when she was personally targeted by sicarios (assassins) who noticed that her truck had Texas license plates. After leaving Mexico, she continued to create art, calling her next exhibition of paintings, Immigrant Pilgrims, her "revenge" on those who drove her out of her home in the colonia.

Orona Gándara died in her home of natural causes on February 18, 2018.

== Work ==
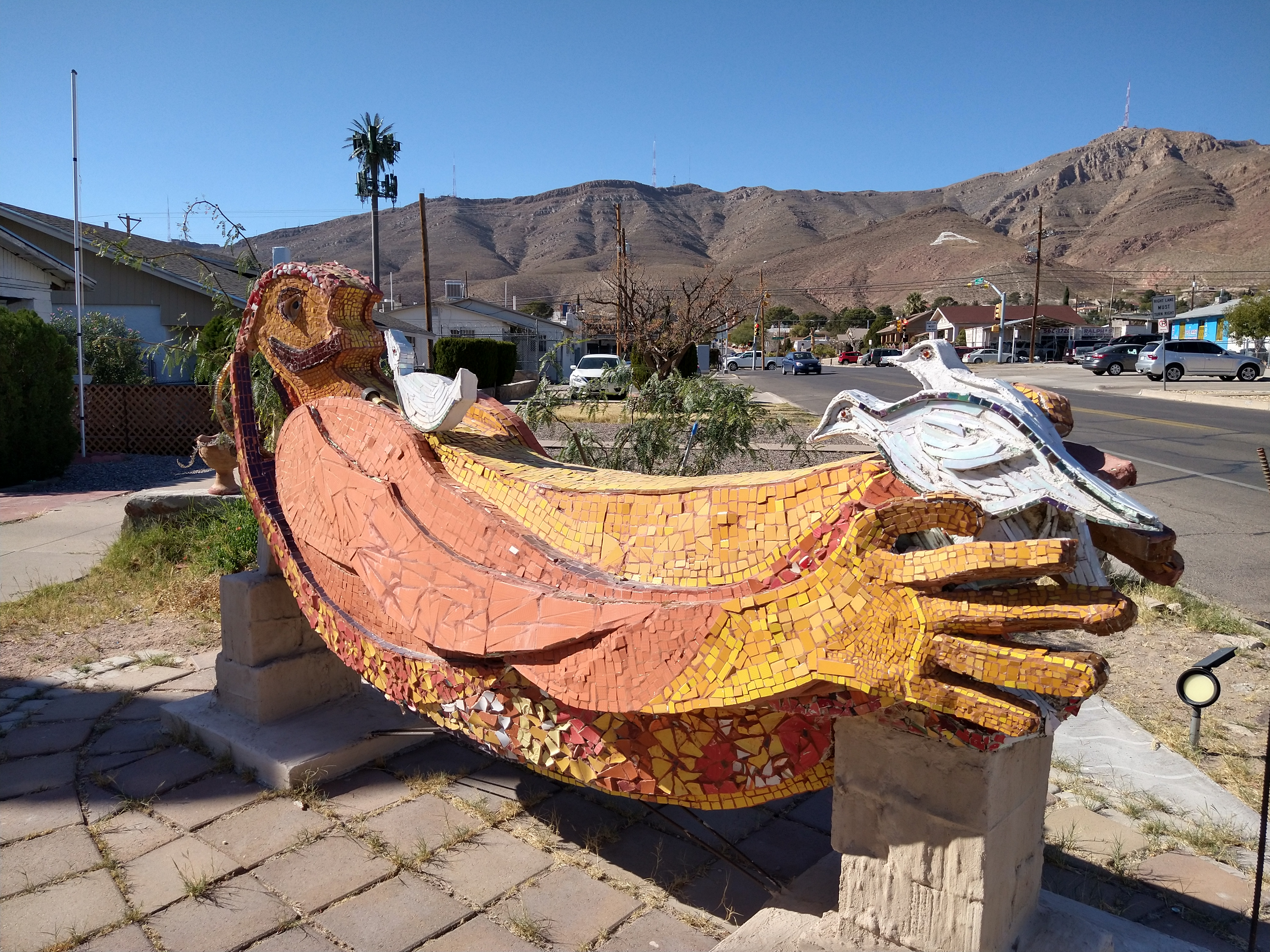
Sculpture of St. Francis of Assisi in El Paso, Texas

Orona Gándara is known as one of the few women creating murals in El Paso's art history. Her work is a cultural mix of both Mexican and American themes and inhabits the concept of nepantla. Her murals, Señor Sol and Time and Sand were created by her working alone. Señor Sol has degraded over time and Orona Gándara considered it "neglected and dishonored." Some of her work was influenced by Aztec themes, such as those displayed on La Avenida de los Aztecas and in the Tourist Information Center for Chamizal in Juárez. Gándara's final work was a tiled sculpture at her own home in Central El Paso based on St. Francis of Assisi.
