= Financial software =

Financial software or financial system software is special application software that records all the financial activity within a business organization. Basic features of this system not only include all the download of accounting software like accounts payable, accounts receivable, ledger, reporting modules and payroll but also explore alternative investment choices and calculate statistical relationships. Features of the system may vary depending on what type of business it is being used for. Primarily, the goal of the financial software is to record, categorize, analyze, compile, interpret and then present an accurate and updated financial dates for every transaction of the business.

== Features of financial software ==
=== Pipeline tracking ===
Pipeline tracking is one of the key features of an accounting system and software for asset management. This provides summarized information on all the details pertaining to the potential investments that are being monitored. The system and software will organize the pipeline and record the source, execution status, approval status, feasible investment capital and the targeted purchase price. It provides an efficient analysis of the best deals, timing and price for the utilization of the investment team. Pipeline tracking provides tracking of the source, history and status. It also provides customized classifications and categories. The system can easily execute a cash flow model and create return assumptions.

Asset management is another important feature of a financial software. It uses the updated status of the investment to provide the necessary tools in creating every possible outcome, such as future payments that are distressed, conversions for debt to equity and maturity of loans. It also provides an efficient tracking of payment dates and rates. Updated financial statements are readily available, which makes it very easy to determine credit standing and as a result make proper adjustments on the projections. Asset management can modify dates of payment, conversion of floating to fixed rates, deferred payments, interest rates, maturity extensions and change schedules for repayment. It also uses various assumptions to store and run multiple cases such as downside, base and upside.

=== Fund management ===
A feature often included is fund management. Modules here provide an accurate projection of all the investments, as well as the borrowing and operating cost of the fund, in order to create a view of the cash levels in the future, with corresponding investment returns, or losses, and their probabilities. This system thereby aids in the evaluation and structuring, including the (ongoing) portfolio optimization, of any fund. Here, it provides a combination of the projections of the cash flow on all investments in order to create a monthly summary, along with anticipated income statements and balance sheets; it also creates an analysis of the leverage and call of the capital. It also typically allows for customized assumptions on the leverage cost, interest income, taxes and expenses, and creates several scenarios concerning the cash allocation such as reinvestments, distribution of investors and fresh investments.

=== Data warehousing ===
Another feature of the financial software, is the data warehousing. This feature syncs the accounting system and retrieves investment transactions. It also uses a customizable category or name. This key feature allows an effortless re-categorization of the investments. The calculation of investment statistics will depend on the computation of the user at any given moment. Customized reports on the performance of the investment can be created using any of the calculations programmed in the database of the system. There are approximately more than 100 various calculations programmed in the system. If there is a need for more calculations, then it can easily be provided for the user. Several investments can be categorized into subgroups or groups and they will be used for the creation of totals. It identifies the total price of the fixed income in comparison to the equity investments.

== Uses of financial software ==
=== Use in pipeline tracking ===
Pipeline tracking has multiple benefits and one of them is that it provides a standard layout for possible deals. It also detects the deals that have been approved but are still awaiting execution. It provides an accurate comparison of the cost of investment with the expected returns. The system can easily provide a recycle plan for investment opportunities. It also creates a manifold portfolio with potential returns by utilizing information on the target industries or regions. Pipeline tracking speeds up the decision-making of the committee for financial investment.

=== Use in fund management ===
There are many benefits of the fund management feature of the financial software. Fund management can determine which specific investments are creating returns. It also pinpoints the availability or shortage of cash. It provides an evaluation of the leverage options as well as determines the effect on the returns. The system also creates a central and systematic modelling, management and analysis of the funds.

=== Use in asset management ===
The benefits of asset management include the creation of a platform for maintaining the projection of cash flow on investments. Excel models also eliminate the possibility of manual errors. Asset management increases the scale and adds investments without the loss of analytic perspective. Through this software managers of portfolios have a better grasp on the performance level of the investment. It also provides accurate information on whether the prediction of the analysts was close to the actual performance of the investment.

== See also ==
- Outline of finance § Financial software tools
- Accounting software
- Application software
- List of free and open-source financial software
- Financial risk management § Investment management
- Financial risk modeling
- Portfolio optimization
