= Oleksandriia (disambiguation) =

Oleksandriia is a city in the Kirovohrad Oblast region in central Ukraine.

Oleksandriia may also refer to:

- Oleksandriia Raion, a district of Kirovohrad Oblast in central Ukraine centred on Oleksandriia
- Oleksandriia, Rivne Oblast, a small village in Rivne Raion, Rivne Oblast, Ukraine
- Oleksandriia, Sumy Oblast, a small village in Sumy Raion, Sumy Oblast, Ukraine

== See also ==
- Alexandria (disambiguation)
