= Alexandria Canal =

Alexandria Canal may refer to:

- Alexandria Canal (Virginia)
- Alexandra Canal (New South Wales)
- Mahmoudiyah Canal (Egypt), sometimes referred to as the "Canal of Alexandria" in old texts
