= Alexandria station (Minnesota) =

- Great Northern Passenger Depot
- U.S. National Register of Historic Places
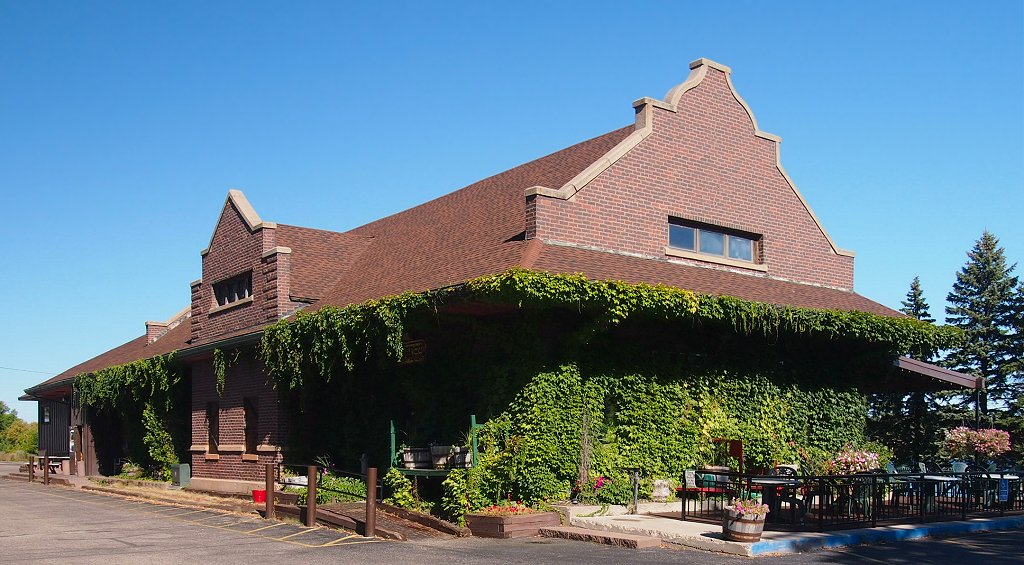
- The Great Northern Passenger Depot from the southeast

- Location within Minnesota Location within the United States
- Location: N. Broadway & Agnes Blvd., Alexandria, Minnesota
- Coordinates: 45°53′30″N 95°22′43″W
- Area: less than one acre
- Built: 1907
- Architect: Great Northern Railway; Evenson, Earle & Aiton
- NRHP reference No.: 85001760
- Added to NRHP: August 15, 1985

Alexandria station is a historic train station in Alexandria, Minnesota. It was listed on the National Register of Historic Places in 1985 as the Great Northern Passenger Depot.

The Saint Paul and Pacific Railroad reached Alexandria in 1878. The Great Northern Railway promoted Alexandria as a tourist destination, with brochures and attractive fares, and the growing tourist traffic made it necessary to replace the original wood-frame depot.

The new depot was built more ornately than the usual depots, which were executed from standardized plans developed by the railroads. The Alexandria depot had mosaic tile floors, birch woodwork, enameled brick wainscoting, and comfortable furniture, and it was located conveniently next to a nearby park. The new depot was one of the largest and most ornate along the Great Northern line in Minnesota.

The Alexandria depot was an active passenger station until May 1, 1971. The depot's last train; Burlington Northern's " Western Star " was not continued by Amtrak & made its last run on April 30, 1971. Freight service continued until 1976, at which point the depot was shuttered. Burlington Northern sold the building in 1984, and its new owners completed a restoration and reopened it the next year as the Depot Express Restaurant and Lounge. The adjacent rail line is now the Central Lakes State Trail.

Preceding station	Great Northern Railway	Following station
Garfield toward Seattle	Main Line Via St. Cloud	Nelson, MN toward St. Paul
