= Alexandria Township =

Alexandria Township may refer to:

- Alexandria Township, Leavenworth County, Kansas, in Leavenworth County, Kansas
- Alexandria Township, Douglas County, Minnesota
- Alexandria Township, New Jersey
- Alexandria township, Divide County, North Dakota, in Divide County, North Dakota
