= Kandar-e Mohammadi =

Kandar-e Mohammadi كندرمحمدي
- Village
- Location within Iran
- Coordinates: 27°15′40″N 53°23′16″E
- Country: Iran
- Province: Fars
- County: Lamerd
- Bakhsh: Central
- Rural District: Sigar

Population (2006)
  - Total: 361
- Time zone: UTC+3:30 (IRST)
  - Summer (DST): UTC+4:30 (IRDT)

Kandar-e Mohammadi (Persian: كندرمحمدي, also Romanized as Kandar-e Moḩammadī) is a village in Sigar Rural District, in the Central District of Lamerd County, Fars province, Iran. At the 2006 census, its population was 361, in 78 families.
