= Kandar-e Kolah Boland =

Kandar-e Kolah Boland كندركلاه بلند
- Village
- Location within Iran
- Coordinates: 27°15′37″N 53°22′16″E
- Country: Iran
- Province: Fars
- County: Lamerd
- Bakhsh: Central
- Rural District: Sigar

Population (2006)
  - Total: 297
- Time zone: UTC+3:30 (IRST)
  - Summer (DST): UTC+4:30 (IRDT)

Kandar-e Kolah Boland (Persian: كندركلاه بلند, also Romanized as Kandar-e Kolāh Boland and Kondor Kolah Boland) is a village in Sigar Rural District, in the Central District of Lamerd County, Fars province, Iran. At the 2006 census, its population was 297, in 63 families.
