= Kaneh Har =

Kaneh Har كنه هر
- Village
- Location within Iran
- Coordinates: 34°26′06″N 46°12′35″E
- Country: Iran
- Province: Kermanshah
- County: Dalahu
- Bakhsh: Central
- Rural District: Bivanij

Population (2006)
  - Total: 255
- Time zone: UTC+3:30 (IRST)
  - Summer (DST): UTC+4:30 (IRDT)

Kaneh Har (Persian: كنه هر; also known as Kanahar and Kandahar) is a village in the Bivanij Rural District, which is in the Central District of Dalahu County, Kermanshah Province, Iran. In the 2006 census, its population was 255, in 59 families. The village is populated by Kurds.
