= Gandhari Amman Kovil =

Hindu temple in Kerala, India

Coordinates: 8°29′36.62″N 76°56′58.56″E

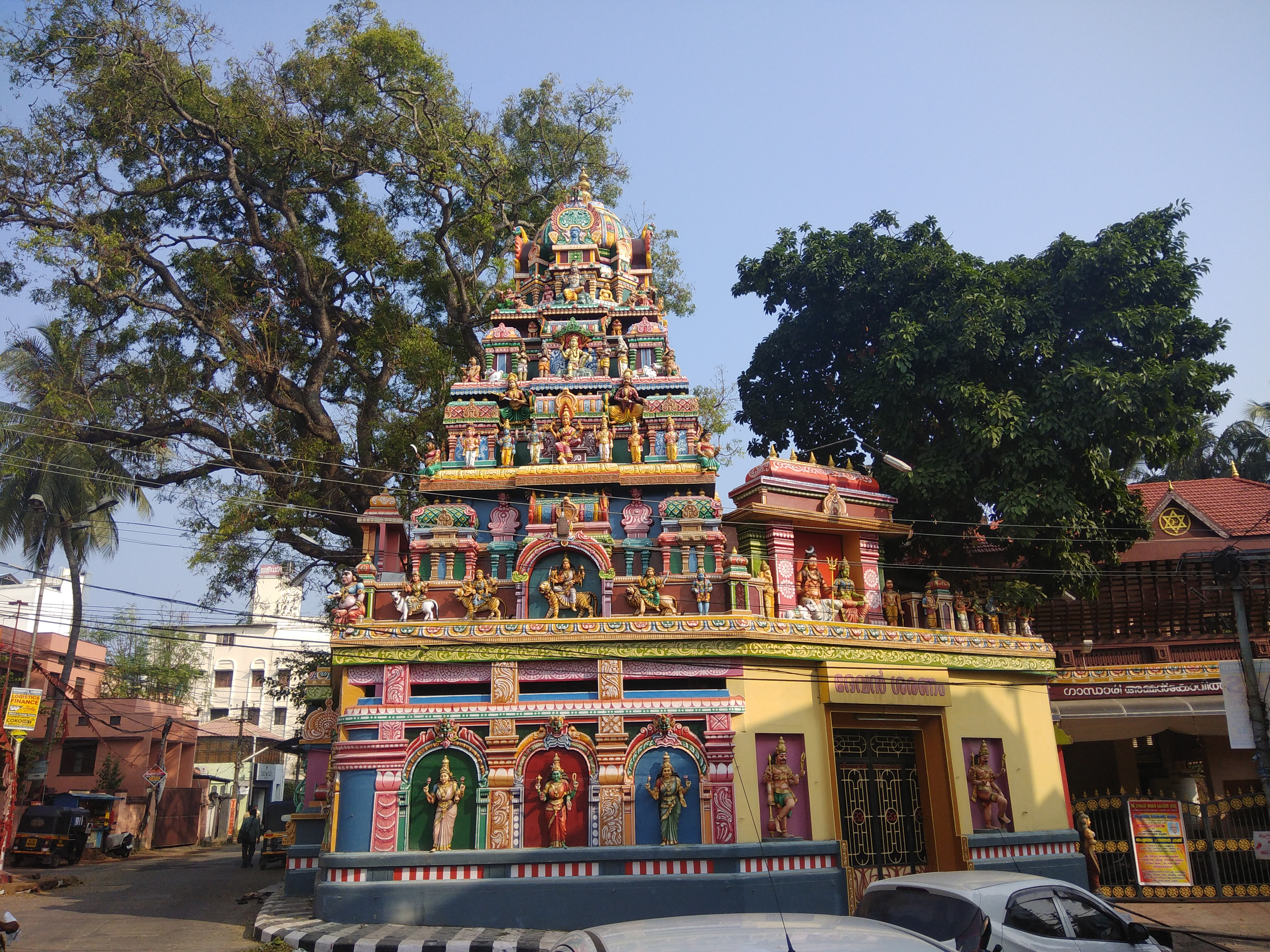
Gandhari Amman Kovil, Mele Thampanoor, near BTR Bhavan, Thiruvananthapuram

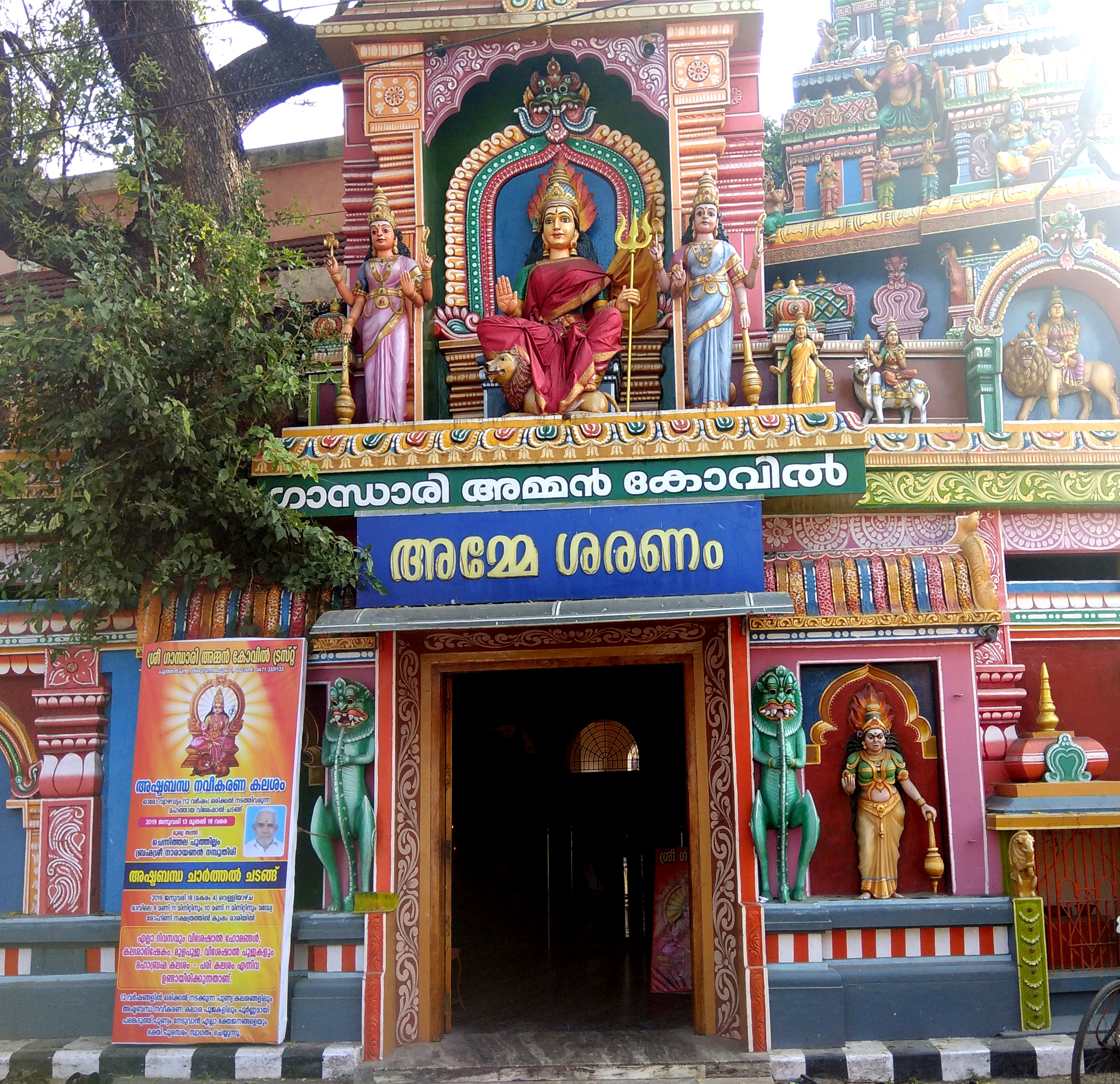
Gandhari Amman Kovil, front side

Gandhari Amman Kovil is a Hindu temple located at Mele Thampanoor, Thiruvananthapuram, Kerala, India. Gandhari amman is the principal deity in this temple. There are other small temples of Ganesha, Muruga swamy, Naaga Devathas, Bhairavar, Navagrahas and Manthramurthi are located in this temple complex. Chithra poornima is the main festival in this temple. This festival is celebrated in the month of May.

This kovil is located 1.5 km from Thiruvananthapuram central Railway Station, Thampanoor.
