= Alexandria High School =

Alexandria High School, Alexandria Area High School, Alexandria Senior High School, or Alexandria City High School may refer to:

- Alexandria Area High School (Minnesota)
- Alexandria City High School (Virginia)
- Alexandria High School (Alabama)
- Alexandria Senior High School (Louisiana)
