= Alexandria Hyphasis =

Fortress on the west bank of the Hyphasis (Beas) river

Coordinates: 31°41′N 74°55′E

Alexandria (on the) Hyphasis was the name of the fortress on the west bank of the Hyphasis (Beas) river at which Alexander the Great stopped on 31 Aug 326 BCE in the course of his Indian campaign. It was on the eastern border of Alexander's empire. Today, it is near Amritsar, part of Punjab, India.

Alexander's army, exhausted, homesick, and anxious at the prospect of having to face yet again large Indian armies throughout the Indo-Gangetic Plain, mutinied at the Hyphasis river and refused to march further east. Alexander, after a meeting with his officer, Coenus, and after hearing about the lament of his soldiers, eventually relented, being convinced that it was better to return.
