= Kandar-e Abdol Reza =

Kandar-e Abdol Reza كندرعبدالرضا
- Village
- Location within Iran
- Coordinates: 27°16′31″N 53°21′14″E
- Country: Iran
- Province: Fars
- County: Lamerd
- Bakhsh: Central
- Rural District: Sigar

Population (2006)
  - Total: 587
- Time zone: UTC+3:30 (IRST)
  - Summer (DST): UTC+4:30 (IRDT)

Kandar-e Abdol Reza (Persian: كندرعبدالرضا, also Romanized as Kandar-e 'Abdol Reẕā; also known as Kandar-e 'Abd or Reẕā) is a village in Sigar Rural District, in the Central District of Lamerd County, Fars province, Iran. At the 2006 census, its population was 587, in 125 families.
