= Gandharv =

The Gandharv (sometimes pronounced Gandharb) are a Hindu community found in North India.

== Origin ==
The Gandharv are an ancient community, frequently mentioned in ancient Sanskrit texts as a group associated with singing and dancing to entertain the gods. They are divided into seven exogamous clans, known as gotras. These seven clans are the Arakh, Sital, Ramsi, Shahimal, Hiwan, Panchbhaiya, and Dhomana. The Gandharv are found mainly in the Hindu holy cities of Allahabad and Varanasi. They speak both standard Hindi and the Bhojpuri dialect. Traditionally, the Gandharv were a community of singers and musicians, who were often employed by nautch girls. Half of the fees were given to the Gandharv. They have a seen a decline in their traditional occupation, and many are now landless agricultural labourers.
