= Alexandria Airport =

Alexandria Airport may refer to:

- Alexandreia Airport in Alexandria, Greece (ICAO: LGAX)
- Alexandria Airport (Indiana) in Alexandria, Indiana, United States (FAA: I99)
- Alexandria Airport (New Jersey) in Pittstown, Alexandria Township, New Jersey, United States (FAA: N85)
- Alexandria Aerodrome in Alexandria, Ontario, Canada (TC: CNS4)
- Alexandria International Airport (Egypt) serving Alexandria, Egypt (IATA: ALY, ICAO: HEAX)
  - its predecessor, El Nouzha Airport, a defunct airport
- Alexandria International Airport (Louisiana) in Alexandria, Louisiana, United States (FAA/IATA: AEX)
- Alexandria Municipal Airport (Chandler Field) in Alexandria, Minnesota, United States (FAA/IATA: AXN)

Airports in places named Alexandria:

- Esler Airfield in Alexandria, Louisiana, United States (FAA/IATA: ESF)
