= Kondor D 6 =

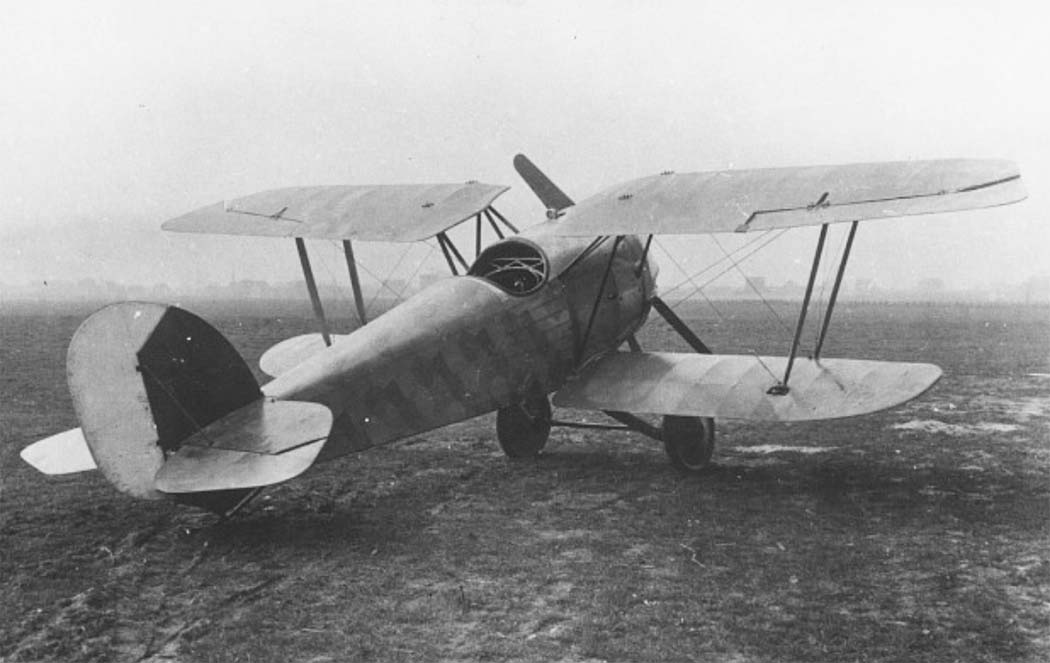

General information
- Type: Fighter aircraft
- National origin: Germany
- Manufacturer: Kondor Flugzeugwerke GmbH, Essen
- Designer: Walter Rethel
- Number built: 1

History
- First flight: Summer 1918

The Kondor D 6 was a prototype German biplane fighter aircraft flown in 1918. In the interests of better upward vision for the pilot, its upper wing was in two halves, separated over the central fuselage. Its development was soon abandoned.

== Design and development ==
In most respects the D 6 was a conventional biplane fighter; its one distinguishing feature came from an attempt to improve the pilot's upward view, normally limited by the upper wing. The usual approach was to position the cockpit under the wing trailing edge and form a cut-out in its edge but the D 6 took this to the extreme of removing all the centre section. Though it served its immediate purpose, this feature required extra cabane strengthening and much increased the induced drag associated with vortices at wing tips, now six rather than four in number.

The D 6 was a single bay biplane with pairs of parallel, outward leaning interplane struts. There was no stagger on the leading edges, though the lower wing was smaller both in span and chord. Each upper wing tip was supported over the fuselage by a N-form strut, one foot at mid-fuselage and the forward one higher. The lower wing was conventionally attached to the lower fuselage. The half span, broad and horn balanced ailerons were on the upper wing only.

The fuselage of the D 6 used Kondor's usual steel tube structure, though fabric rather than plywood covered. It was flat sided and tapered strongly in plan behind the 145 hp (108 kW) Oberursel Ur.III eleven cylinder rotary engine which was completely cowled, driving a large spinner and two blade propeller. Together, the fin and rudder were oval; the trapezoidal tailplane with rounded balanced elevators was on the top of the fuselage and the deep rudder required a gap between the elevators for its movement. The D 6 had a fixed single axle undercarriage, with mainwheels mounted on cross wire braced V-struts and a tailskid.

The D 6 was test flown in the summer of 1918 but development was soon abandoned.

== Specifications (D 6) ==
Data from Green and Swanborough 1994

General characteristics

- Crew: One
- Length: 5.80 m (19 ft 0 in)
- Wingspan: 8.25 m (27 ft 1 in)
- Height: 2.53 m (8 ft 4 in)
- Wing area: 13.80 m^{2} (148.5 sq ft)
- Empty weight: 420 kg (926 lb)
- Gross weight: 645 kg (1,422 lb)
- Powerplant: 1 × Oberursel Ur.III 11-cylinder rotary engine, 108 kW (145 hp)
- Propellers: 2-bladed

Performance

- Maximum speed: 106 km/h (66 mph, 57 kn)
- Endurance: 1.5 hr

Armament

- 2× LMG 08/15 7.9 mm (0.31 in) fixed machine guns firing through the propeller.
