= Kondor (surname) =

Kondor is a Hungarian surname. Notable people with the surname include:

- Béla Kondor (1931–1972), Hungarian artist, writer, poet, and photographer
- Duško Kondor (1947–2007), Bosnian Serb human rights activist
- Robbie Kondor (1955–2025), American composer, musician, and arranger
- Vilmos Kondor (born 1954), Hungarian author
