= Kantar, Nusaybin =

Village in Mardin Province, Turkey

Kantar
- Neighbourhood
- Location in Turkey
- Coordinates: 37°05′50″N 41°25′58″E
- Country: Turkey
- Province: Mardin
- District: Nusaybin
- Population (2021): 353
- Time zone: UTC+3 (TRT)

Kantar (Kurdish: Qenter; Syriac: Qanṭarah) is a neighbourhood in the municipality and district of Nusaybin, Mardin Province in Turkey. The village is populated by Kurds of the Mizizex tribe and had a population of 353 in 2021.

== History ==
Qanṭarah (today called Kantar) was historically inhabited by Syriac Orthodox Christians. In the Syriac Orthodox patriarchal register of dues of 1870, it was recorded that the village had eight households, who paid twenty-four dues, and it did not have a church or a priest.

== Bibliography ==
- Bcheiry, Iskandar (2009). The Syriac Orthodox Patriarchal Register of Dues of 1870: An Unpublished Historical Document from the Late Ottoman Period. Gorgias Press.
- Tan, Altan (2018). Turabidin'den Berriye'ye. Aşiretler - Dinler - Diller - Kültürler (in Turkish). Pak Ajans Yayincilik Turizm Ve Diş Ticaret Limited şirketi. ISBN 9789944360944.
