= Burj Kandhari =

- Village
- Location in Punjab, India Burj Kandhari (India)
- Coordinates: 31.2142993°N 75.8296026°E
- Country: India
- State: Punjab
- District: Shaheed Bhagat Singh Nagar

Government
  - Type: Panchayat raj
  - Body: Gram panchayat
- Elevation: 254 m (833 ft)

Population (2011)
  - Total: 654
- Sex ratio 322/332 ♂/♀

Languages
  - Official: Punjabi
- Time zone: UTC+5:30 (IST)
- PIN: 144501
- Telephone code: 01884
- ISO 3166 code: IN-PB
- Post office: Kultham
- Website: nawanshahr.nic.in

Burj Kandhari is a village in Shaheed Bhagat Singh Nagar district of Punjab State, India. It is located 8.7 kilometres (5.4 mi) away from Phagwara, 18 kilometres (11 mi) from Banga, 29 kilometres (18 mi) from district headquarter Shaheed Bhagat Singh Nagar and 122 kilometres (76 mi) from state capital Chandigarh. The village is administrated by Sarpanch an elected representative of the village.

== Demography ==
As of 2011, Burj Kandhari has a total number of 141 houses and population of 654 of which 322 include are males while 332 are females according to the report published by Census India in 2011. The literacy rate of Burj Kandhari is 80.72%, higher than the state average of 75.84%. The population of children under the age of 6 years is 73 which is 11.16% of total population of Burj Kandhari, and child sex ratio is approximately 921 as compared to Punjab state average of 846.

Most of the people are from Schedule Caste which constitutes 75.99% of total population in Burj Kandhari. The town does not have any Schedule Tribe population so far.

As per the report published by Census India in 2011, 168 people were engaged in work activities out of the total population of Burj Kandhari which includes 158 males and 10 females. According to census survey report 2011, 80.95% workers describe their work as main work and 19.05% workers are involved in Marginal activity providing livelihood for less than 6 months.

== Education ==
The village has a Punjabi medium, co-ed upper primary school founded in 1996. The schools provide mid-day meal as per Indian Midday Meal Scheme and the meal prepared in school premises. As per Right of Children to Free and Compulsory Education Act the school provide free education to children between the ages of 6 and 14.

Amardeep Singh Shergill Memorial college Mukandpur and Sikh National College Banga are the nearest colleges. Lovely Professional University is 20 kilometres (12 mi) away from the village.

List of schools nearby:

- Sat Modern Public School, Mangat Dingrian
- Guru Teg Bahadur Model School, Behram
- Guru Ram Dass Public School, Cheta
- Lovely Public School, Pathlawa

== Transport ==
Banga railway station is the nearest train station however, Phagwara Junction railway station is 9.8 kilometres (6.1 mi) away from the village. Sahnewal Airport is the nearest domestic airport which located 59 kilometres (37 mi) away in Ludhiana and the nearest international airport is located in Chandigarh also Sri Guru Ram Dass Jee International Airport is the second nearest airport which is 125 kilometres (78 mi) away in Amritsar.

== See also ==
- List of villages in India
