= Kondor (automobile) =

The Kondor was a German automobile manufactured from 1902 until 1904. The 5 hp two-seater was the product of a bicycle works.
