= Qandhari =

- Country: Pakistan
- Region: Federally Administered Tribal Areas
- District: Mohmand Agency
- Tehsil: Safi

Population (2017)
  - Total: 26,704
- Time zone: UTC+5 (PST)
  - Summer (DST): UTC+6 (PDT)

Qandhari is an area of Safi Tehsil, Mohmand Agency, Federally Administered Tribal Areas, Pakistan. The population is 26,704 according to the 2017 census.
