= Sugandhaparimalesvarar Temple, Tirumanancheri =

Shiva temple in Tamil Nadu, India

Sugandhaparimalesvarar Temple is a Siva temple in Tirumanancheri in karambakkudi taluk of Pudukkottai district in Tamil Nadu, India.

== Location ==
This temple is located in Pudukottai-Karambakkudi road, at a distance of 45 km. from Pudukottai.

== Presiding deity ==
The presiding deity is known as Sugandhaparimalesvarar and the goddess is known as Periyanayaki. The presiding deity is also known as Thirumananathar. When Kalamega Pulavar came to this place, for worshipping the Shiva, he had to cross the river Agniyar. Due to the rays of the Sun he could not able to walk. Then he prayed to the deity, and due to the grace of Shiva, water came into the river. Later he walked easily, without heat and crossed the river.

== Speciality ==
The devotees believe that the deity would wipe out all the diseases. In Shiva temples, nandhi could be seen near the flagpost. But in this temple it is found in front raja gopura. There is no separate mandapa for Nandhi. It is found sitting on the floor. There is no temple tree for this temple.

== Festivals ==
The temple is opened for worship from 6.00 to 12.00 noon and 4.00 to 8.30 p.m.Pujas are held four times daily at Kalasanthi (8.30 a.m.), Uttchikkalam (noon 12.00), Sayaratchai (6.00 p.m.) and arthajamam (8.00 p.m.). The first day of Tamil New Year, Vaikasi visakam 10 days, Adipperukku, Thaipusam and Navaratri and other festivals are held here.
