= Farah Citadel =

Citadel in Farah, Afghanistan

Coordinates: 32°22′58″N 62°06′44″E

The Citadel of Farah (Pashto; Dari: ارگ فراه), also known as the Citadel of Alexander, and locally known as Shar-e-Farahdun is an ancient fort in Afghanistan. When Alexander the Great invaded the area it was known as Prophthasia in Drangiana: the Drangian capital Phrada was just renamed in October 330; 'Prophthasia' means 'Anticipation', modern Farâh, Afghanistan.

The Citadel sits on the edge of Farah City. Looking out over this western desert city, the Citadel covers the distance of one kilometre from the corner of an interior wall to the opposite corner. The fortress walls are 50 feet high.

== History ==
Occupations of the citadel stretch back at least 2,500 years. The massive, weathered earthen walls of an ancient citadel remain atop a low rise a short distance from Farah's main bazaar. The origins of the Citadel have been lost in the vast passage of time since its construction. Some claim it was built by Alexander the Great. Others say the citadel is to have been built by Zoroastrian warriors in the time of Darius the Great (reigned 522-486 BC). Some renovations built atop the ancient foundation may add to the confusion regarding the age of the Citadel.

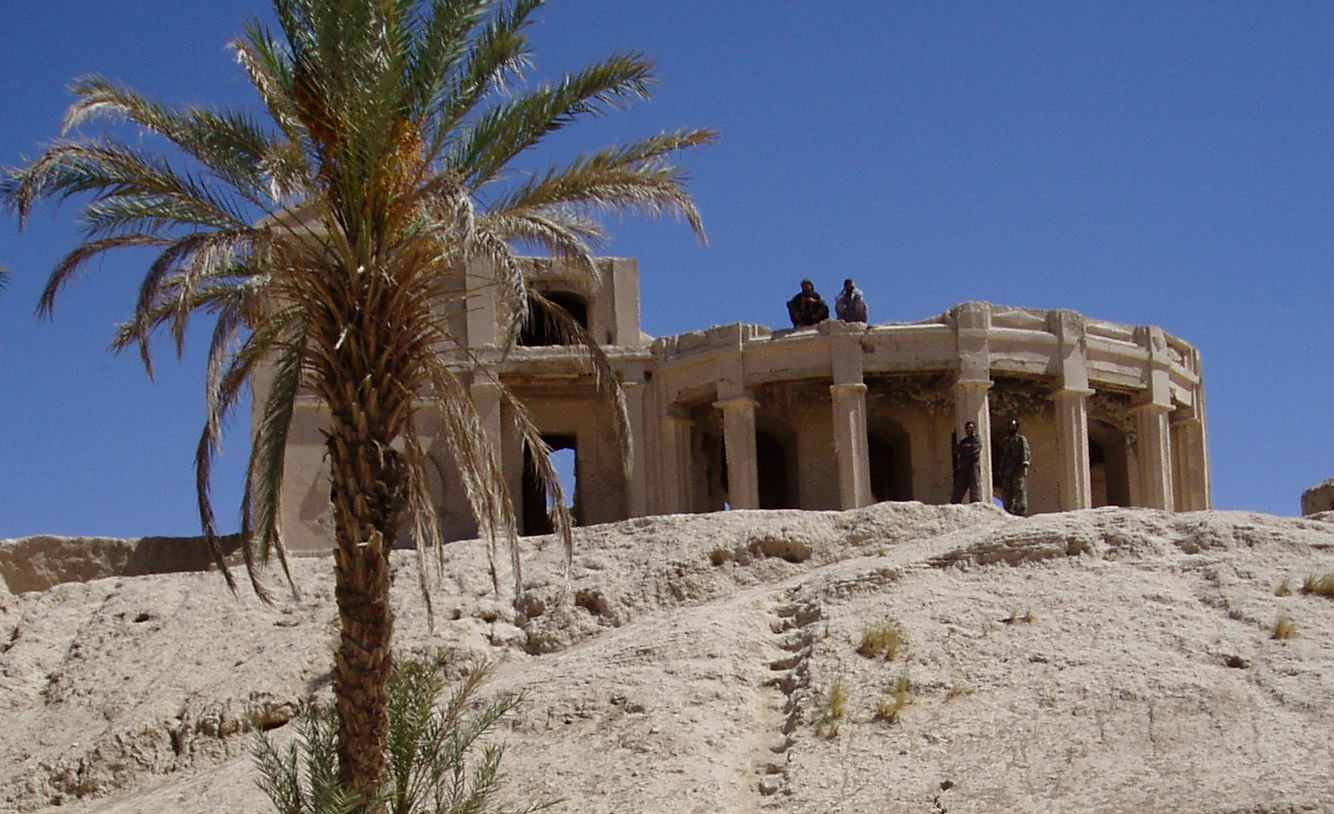
The Citadel of Alexander the Great in Farah, Afghanistan

Alexander the Great, who arrived in Drangiana in November 330 BC on his way to Kandahar, found a well-organized province of the Achaemenid Empire, ruled by a man named Barsaentes, who was satrap of both Drangiana and Arachosia. Alexander appointed a new satrap, Arsames, and renamed the capital; it became known as Prophthasia, 'Anticipation', because Alexander had here discovered a conspiracy against his life, said to be organized by his companion Philotas. After the death of Alexander, his empire fell apart and his generals divided the countries he had conquered.

Drangiana fell to Seleucus I Nicator, the founder of the Seleucid Empire. For more than a century, the Seleucids remained in control of the region. There is some evidence that it was in Drangiana that the adherents of the religion founded by Zarathustra came together to re-establish their faith and sacred text, the Avesta. At the beginning of the second century, Bactria made itself independent from the Seleucid empire. Their leaders, who considered themselves to be Greeks, tried to conquer adjacent territories, and c.184 they seized Gandhara and Drangiana. The Graeco-Bactrian overlordship did not last very long: after a generation, Drangiana was conquered by the Parthians. It was put together with Aria in one tax district. The Parthian reign did not last very long either: in 128 BC, the country was taken over by the Sacae. This is the usual name for the nomad tribes of Central Asia. They had always been kept away from Iran, but had ravaged the Graeco-Bactrian kingdom three or two years before. Drangiana became known as Sacastane, a word that has changed into Sistan, its modern name.

The citadel was a minor way-station on the Silk Road network between Persia and India, between which traveled textiles, spices, and treasures.

In the 1980s, the Mujahadeen used it as an arms depot. Its expansive interior remains littered with unexploded ordnance.

=== Construction ===
The domed ceilings and mud walls of the fortress reflect the same construction used in many Farahi homes today. The combination of shape and natural building materials keep the rooms cool in the summer and warm in the winter.

=== Restoration ===
The Citadel has fallen into disrepair over the centuries. Inside the walls sit the remains of rusting Soviet-style vehicles and shepherds roam the grounds with flocks of sheep. Mujahedeen fighters used it as an arms depot during the 1980s. Today the local people use the space for family picnics. A proposal has been submitted to the Ministry of Information and Culture requesting funds to repair the historic site.
