= Kandar-e Sheykh =

Kandar-e Sheykh كندرشيخ
- Village
- Location within Iran
- Coordinates: 27°16′04″N 53°22′34″E
- Country: Iran
- Province: Fars
- County: Lamerd
- Bakhsh: Central
- Rural District: Sigar

Population (2006)
  - Total: 67
- Time zone: UTC+3:30 (IRST)
  - Summer (DST): UTC+4:30 (IRDT)

Kandar-e Sheykh (Persian: كندرشيخ) is a village in Sigar Rural District, in the Central District of Lamerd County, Fars province, Iran. At the 2006 census, its population was 67, in 16 families.
