= Congress of Traditional Leaders of South Africa =

South African non-governmental pressure group

The Congress of Traditional Leaders of South Africa (CONTRALESA) is a South African non-governmental pressure group which was formed in 1987 by some of the traditional leaders of the homeland of KwaNdebele, with the support of the United Democratic Front and the African National Congress. Contralesa helped to form the anti-apartheid front in the homelands, and continues to advocate greater rights for traditional leaders in the country in the post-apartheid era.

It also participates in both national and provincial traditional leaders' gatherings to garner support for legislation from non-Contralesa members.

== LGBT issues ==
Contralesa has frequently taken a stance against the recognition of LGBT rights.

=== Statements by King Goodwill Zwelethini ===
Contralesa members criticised LGBT rights advocate groups for criticising Zulu traditional king Goodwill Zwelethini kaBhekuzulu, and contended that the translation by the journalist recording the statements was inaccurate.

=== Proposal to amend Section 9 of the Constitution ===
In 2012, Contralesa, through the NHTL, filed a draft document calling for the removal of LGBT rights from the Constitution of South Africa. The group submitted a proposal to the Constitutional Review Committee of the National Assembly to amend section 9 of the Constitution; the committee, at the time, was chaired by Sango Patekile Holomisa MP, who is also president of Contralesa. Holomisa made comments pursuant to Contralesa's attempt.

Contralesa and Holomisa's comments were criticized by the Democratic Alliance and constitutional law scholar Pierre de Vos.

== See also ==
- National House of Traditional Leaders
