= Al-Qantara, Marjayoun =

Village in Marjeyoun District, Lebanon

Al-Qantara القنطرة
- Municipality
- Location within Lebanon
- Coordinates: 33°16′25″N 35°27′49″E
- Grid position: 193/297 PAL
- Country: Lebanon
- Control: Israel
- Governorate: Nabatieh Governorate
- District: Marjayoun District
- Elevation: 470 m (1,540 ft)
- Time zone: UTC+2 (EET)
  - Summer (DST): UTC+3 (EEST)
- Dialing code: +961

Al-Qantara (القنطرة) is a municipality in the Marjayoun District in southern Lebanon.

== Etymology ==
According to E. H. Palmer, the name El Kantarah means "the arch", qantara (Arabic: قنطرة) also being used in Arabic to denote a bridge built of stone or masonry, an aqueduct or a dam, and a high building.

== History ==
In 1875 Victor Guérin found that the village had 150 Metawileh inhabitants. He further remarked: "The mosque is built of hewn stones of apparent antiquity. Its door is surmounted by a lintel belonging to an ancient Christian church, in the midst of which can be made out a cross with equal branches enclosed in a circle."

In 1881, the PEF's Survey of Western Palestine (SWP) described it: "A village, built of stone, containing about 250 [..] Metawileh, situated on an isolated and conspicuous hill, and surrounded by gardens, olives, and figs. There are two perennial springs a little to the south of the village."

On 24 August 1994 two members of Hizbollah were killed in Qantara in clashes with the South Lebanon Army.

== Demographics ==
In 2014, Muslims made up 99.80% of registered voters in Al-Qantara. 98.27% of the voters were Shiite Muslims.

== Bibliography ==
- Conder, C.R.; Kitchener, H.H. (1881). The Survey of Western Palestine: Memoirs of the Topography, Orography, Hydrography, and Archaeology. Vol. 1. London: Committee of the Palestine Exploration Fund.
- Guérin, V. (1880). Description Géographique Historique et Archéologique de la Palestine (in French). Vol. 3: Galilee, pt. 2. Paris: L'Imprimerie Nationale.
- Palmer, E.H. (1881). The Survey of Western Palestine: Arabic and English Name Lists Collected During the Survey by Lieutenants Conder and Kitchener, R. E. Transliterated and Explained by E.H. Palmer. Committee of the Palestine Exploration Fund.
