= Kandari =

- town
- Location in Maharashtra, India
- Coordinates: 21.0579°N 75.8142°E
- Country: India
- State: Maharashtra
- District: Jalgaon

Population (2011)
  - Total: 16,353

Languages
  - Official: Marathi
- Time zone: UTC+5:30 (IST)

Kandari is a census town in Bhusawal Taluka and in Jalgaon District in the Indian state of Maharashtra.

== Demographics ==
As of 2001 India census, Kandari had a population of 15,192. Males constitute 53% of the population and females 47%. Kandari has an average literacy rate of 79%, higher than the national average of 59.5%: male literacy is 85%, and female literacy is 73%. In Kandari, 11% of the population is under 6 years

Year	Male	Female	Total Population	Change	Religion (%)							
Year	Male	Female	Total Population	Change	Hindu	Muslim	Christian	Sikhs	Buddhist	Jain	Other religions and persuasions	Religion not stated
2001	8035	7157	15192	-	73.124	6.029	1.942	0.276	18.358	0.112	0.079	0.079
2011	8570	7783	16353	0.076	73.246	5.705	2.281	0.300	17.483	0.275	0.196	0.514
