= Alexandria (schooner) =

History
- Name: Yngve (1929-1939); Lindö (1939-1984); Alexandria (1984-1996)
- Launched: 1929
- Fate: Foundered and sank, 9 December 1996

General characteristics
- Type: Three-masted topsail schooner
- Length: 125 ft (38 m) (sparred)
- Beam: 22 ft (6.7 m)
- Height: 85 ft (26 m)
- Draft: 9 ft 2 in (2.79 m)

Alexandria was a cargo-carrying three-masted schooner built in 1929. Originally named Yngve, she was built at Björkenäs, Sweden, and fitted with a 58 H.P. auxiliary oil engine.

Around 1937 her Rigging was changed to ketch. In 1939, she was sold and renamed Lindö. She operated in Baltic waters as a coastal trader until 1975 when she crossed the Atlantic to New York City. In early 1976, she was rebuilt and rerigged as a three-masted topsail schooner, her original rig. She took part in Operation Sail that July, and a similar event at Boston in 1980. In 1984, she was acquired by the Alexandria Seaport Foundation a non profit corporation in Alexandria, Virginia, and renamed Alexandria.

The foundation kept her as a live museum in Alexandria and sailed her as a goodwill ambassador for the city of Alexandria. She participated in several races and tall ship reunions sailing as far north as Boston and as far south as the Gulf of Mexico. During this time she was rigged with bowsprit, jib-boom, foremast, mainmast and mizzenmast, all three masts fitted with topmasts and gaffs for the gaff sails and the fore topmast fitted with three yards for the topsails. The sails were four headsails, three gaff sails and three gaff topsails (one on each mast), upper and lower square topsails on the foremast, a staysail between the fore and main masts and another staysail between the main and mizzen masts.

The ship was used in the 1980 movie "The Island" (as the Lindö) starring Michael Caine. In the movie, the ship is extensively featured in a scene where the ship is captured by pirates, the ship's crew is killed, and the ship sunk. The Lindö is easily recognizable because of its distinctive red sails. IMDB

In fall 1993, in New Orleans, she was a prop in the making of the film Interview with the Vampire. She then spent the winter in New Orleans and was sailed back to Alexandria the following spring. In early 1996, a survey reported that the ship was not seaworthy and would require extensive and expensive repairs to get her back into good condition. The Alexandria Seaport Foundation did not have the means to repair her and in fall 1996 the ship was sold to Yale Iverson, a lawyer from Iowa. The new owner ignored warnings against taking the ship out in the Atlantic in bad weather and, after taking in water all night, on 9 December 1996, at around 6:30am, Alexandria sank off Cape Hatteras, North Carolina. The crew of seven were rescued by the Coast Guard, five of them right away and two after 6½ hours in the water.
