= Kandara (disambiguation) =

Kandara is a town in Muranga County, Kenya

Kandara (also written with C and dh) may also refer to:

- Kandara Constituency, an electoral constituency in Kenya
- Candara or Kandara (Ancient Greek: Κάνδαρα), a town of ancient Paphlagonia
- Kandara, a musical group from Pokhara, Nepal, established in 1992
- Kandara Airport, the first airport located within Jeddah, Saudi Arabia, closed in 1981
- Kandhara or Gandhara, a village in Odisha, India

== See also ==
- Kandar (disambiguation)
- Kandari (disambiguation)
- Kandahar (disambiguation)
- Gandhara (disambiguation)
- Kantar (disambiguation)
- Kundur (disambiguation)
