= Çandahar =

- Municipality
- Location within Azerbaijan
- Coordinates: 40°55′N 48°25′E
- Country: Azerbaijan
- Rayon: Ismailli

Population
  - Total: 155
- Time zone: UTC+4 (AZT)
  - Summer (DST): UTC+5 (AZT)

Çandahar (also, Çandaxar, Chandakhar, and Ğəndahar) is a village and municipality in the Ismailli Rayon of Azerbaijan. It has a population of 155. The municipality consists of the villages of Çandahar and Zarat.
