= Kondor, Qazvin =

Village in Qazvin province, Iran

Kondor Persian: كندر
- Village
- Location within Iran
- Coordinates: 36°15′39″N 49°43′31″E
- Country: Iran
- Province: Qazvin
- County: Takestan
- District: Central
- Rural District: Qaqazan-e Sharqi

Population (2016)
  - Total: 1,383
- Time zone: UTC+3:30 (IRST)

Kondor (Persian: كندر) (Note: Also romanized as Kandar and Kondar; also known as Kundar) is a village in Qaqazan-e Sharqi Rural District of the Central District in Takestan County, Qazvin province, Iran.

== Demographics ==
=== Population ===
At the time of the 2006 National Census, the village's population was 1,313 in 304 households. The following census in 2011 counted 1,402 people in 418 households. The 2016 census measured the population of the village as 1,383 people in 423 households.
