= Deh Kohneh (disambiguation) =

Deh Kohneh is an alternate name of Shabankareh, a city in Bushehr Province, Iran.

Deh Kohneh or Deh-e Kohneh or Dehkohneh (Persian: ده كهنه, meaning "old village") may also refer to:

- Deh Kohneh, Tangestan, Bushehr Province
- Deh-e Kohneh, Kiar, Chaharmahal and Bakhtiari Province
- Deh Kohneh, Lordegan, Chaharmahal and Bakhtiari Province
- Deh Kohneh-ye Emamzadeh, Chaharmahal and Bakhtiari Province
- Deh Kohneh-ye Halu Saad, Chaharmahal and Bakhtiari Province
- Deh Kohneh-ye Rugar, Chaharmahal and Bakhtiari Province
- Deh Kohneh, Kazerun, Fars Province
- Deh Kohneh, Khorrambid, Fars Province
- Deh Kohneh, Lamerd, Fars Province
- Deh Kohneh-ye Mollai, Lamerd County, Fars Province
- Deh Kohneh, Marvdasht, Fars Province
- Deh Kohneh, Sepidan, Fars Province
- Deh Kohneh, Dalahu, Kermanshah Province
- Deh Kohneh, Kangavar, Kermanshah Province
- Deh-e Kohneh, Khuzestan
- Deh Kohneh-ye Muzarm, Khuzestan Province
- Deh Kohneh-e Dowbalutan, Khuzestan Province
- Dehkohneh-ye Hamidabad, Kohgiluyeh and Boyer-Ahmad Province
- Deh Kohneh-e Mazdak, Kohgiluyeh and Boyer-Ahmad Province
- Deh Kohneh-ye Zafari, Kohgiluyeh and Boyer-Ahmad Province
