= AHL (disambiguation) =

The American Hockey League is a professional ice hockey league in the US and Canada.

AHL or Ahl may also refer to:

== Places ==
- Ahl, East Azerbaijan, Iran
- Ahel, Iran
- Kudian, Lamerd, Iran
- Ahlu, village in Lahore, Pakistan, ancestral place of the Ahluwalia

== Sports leagues ==
- Alps Hockey League, professional ice hockey league in Austria, Italy, and Slovenia
- Armenian Hockey League, top ice hockey league in Armenia
- Australian Hockey League, Australian national field hockey league
- Allianz Hurling League, a hurling league in Ireland and England

== Other uses ==
- Ahl (surname)
- Ahlon language
- Associated Humber Lines, an English shipping company
- N-Acyl homoserine lactone
- Achalaite, a mineral with the IMA symbol Ahl
