= Sheykh Amer =

Village in Fars province, Iran

Sheykh Amer Persian: شيخ عامر
- Village
- Location within Iran
- Coordinates: 27°26′44″N 53°24′02″E
- Country: Iran
- Province: Fars
- County: Lamerd
- District: Chah Varz
- Rural District: Sheykh Amer

Population (2016)
  - Total: 1,239
- Time zone: UTC+3:30 (IRST)

Sheykh Amer (Persian: شيخ عامر) (Note: Also romanized as Sheykh ‘Āmer; also known as Shaikh ‘Umar, Sheykh Āmerī, and Sheykh ‘Omar) is a village in, and the capital of, Sheykh Amer Rural District of Chah Varz District, Lamerd County, Fars province, Iran.

== Demographics ==
=== Population ===
At the time of the 2006 National Census, the village's population was 1,575 in 279 households, when it was in Chah Varz Rural District of the Central District. The following census in 2011 counted 850 people in 210 households. The 2016 census measured the population of the village as 1,239 people in 344 households, by which time the rural district had been separated from the district in the establishment of Chah Varz District. Sheykh Amer was transferred to Sheykh Amer Rural District created in the new district. It was the most populous village in its rural district.
