= Roknabad, Lamerd =

Roknabad رکن‌آباد
- Village
- Location within Iran
- Coordinates: 27°14′16″N 53°25′45″E
- Country: Iran
- Province: Fars
- County: Lamerd
- Bakhsh: Eshkanan
- Rural District: Eshkanan

Population (2006)
  - Total: 777
- Time zone: UTC+3:30 (IRST)
  - Summer (DST): UTC+4:30 (IRDT)

Roknabad (Persian: رکن‌آباد, also Romanized as Roknābād; also known as Ruknābād and Zeknābād) is a village in Eshkanan Rural District, Eshkanan District, Lamerd County, Fars province, Iran. At the 2006 census, its population was 777, in 160 families.
