= Lashkhareh =

Lashkhareh لشخره
- Village
- Location within Iran
- Coordinates: 27°24′35″N 53°04′17″E
- Country: Iran
- Province: Fars
- County: Lamerd
- Bakhsh: Central
- Rural District: Howmeh

Population (2006)
  - Total: 205
- Time zone: UTC+3:30 (IRST)
  - Summer (DST): UTC+4:30 (IRDT)

Lashkhareh (Persian: لشخره, also Romanized as Lashkharah; also known as Lashkhar) is a village in Howmeh Rural District, in the Central District of Lamerd County, Fars province, Iran. At the 2006 census, its population was 205, in 44 families.
