= Koreh Muchi =

Kareh Muchi كره موچي
- Village
- Location within Iran
- Coordinates: 27°18′14″N 53°16′26″E
- Country: Iran
- Province: Fars
- County: Lamerd
- Bakhsh: Central
- Rural District: Sigar

Population (2006)
  - Total: 754
- Time zone: UTC+3:30 (IRST)
  - Summer (DST): UTC+4:30 (IRDT)

Kareh Muchi (Persian: كره موچي, also Romanized as Kareh Mūchī; also known as Karehmoochī) is a village in Sigar Rural District, in the Central District of Lamerd County, Fars province, Iran. At the 2006 census, its population was 754, in 162 families.
