= Deh Mian, Lamerd =

Village in Fars, Iran

Deh Mian ده ميان
- Village
- Location within Iran
- Coordinates: 27°15′21″N 53°31′42″E
- Country: Iran
- Province: Fars
- County: Lamerd
- Bakhsh: Eshkanan
- Rural District: Eshkanan

Population (2006)
  - Total: 25
- Time zone: UTC+3:30 (IRST)
  - Summer (DST): UTC+4:30 (IRDT)

Deh Mian (Persian: ده ميان, also Romanized as Deh Mīān, Deh-e Mīān, Deh Mayān, Deh Meyān, and Deh Mīyan) is a village in Eshkanan Rural District, Eshkanan District, Lamerd County, Fars province, Iran. At the 2006 census, its population was 25, in 5 families.
