= Koshku, Fars =

Koshku كشكو
- Village
- Location within Iran
- Coordinates: 27°19′11″N 53°27′56″E
- Country: Iran
- Province: Fars
- County: Lamerd
- Bakhsh: Eshkanan
- Rural District: Eshkanan

Population (2006)
  - Total: 639
- Time zone: UTC+3:30 (IRST)
  - Summer (DST): UTC+4:30 (IRDT)

Koshku (Persian: كشكو, also Romanized as Koshkū and Kashkū; also known as Kish Kūh, Kooshk, Koshkūh, Kūshkū, and Poshtkūh) is a village in Eshkanan Rural District, Eshkanan District, Lamerd County, Fars province, Iran. At the 2006 census, its population was 639, in 152 families.
