= Kherreh =

Kherreh or Kharreh (Persian: خره) may refer to:

- Kherreh, Bushehr
- Kherreh, Fars

== See also ==
- Kherreh Siah
- Mian Kherreh
