= Paqalat =

Village in Lamerd County, Fars province, Iran

Paqalat پاقلات
- Village
- Location within Iran
- Coordinates: 27°16′26″N 53°43′20″E
- Country: Iran
- Province: Fars
- County: Lamerd
- Bakhsh: Eshkanan
- Rural District: Kal

Population (2006)
  - Total: 1,007
- Time zone: UTC+3:30 (IRST)
  - Summer (DST): UTC+4:30 (IRDT)

Paqalat (Persian: پاقلات, also Romanized as Pāqalāt and Pā Qalāt; also known as Bā Qalāt, Bāqlāt, Pā Ghalāt, Paghelat, Pa Kalāt, Pā Oalāt, and Pa yi Kalāt) is a village in Kal Rural District, Eshkanan District, Lamerd County, Fars province, Iran. At the 2006 census, its population was 1,007, in 189 families.
