= Ehsham, Fars =

Ehsham احشام
- Village
- Location within Iran
- Coordinates: 27°28′44″N 53°20′24″E
- Country: Iran
- Province: Fars
- County: Lamerd
- Bakhsh: Central
- Rural District: Chah Varz

Population (2006)
  - Total: 345
- Time zone: UTC+3:30 (IRST)
  - Summer (DST): UTC+4:30 (IRDT)

Ehsham (Persian: احشام, also Romanized as Eḩshām and Aḩshām; also known as Eyshūm and Ishom) is a village in Chah Varz Rural District, in the Central District of Lamerd County, Fars province, Iran. At the 2006 census, its population was 345, in 65 families.
