= Deh Now-e Fazeli =

Deh Now-e Fazeli ده نوفاضلي
- Village
- Location within Iran
- Coordinates: 27°27′31″N 53°22′39″E
- Country: Iran
- Province: Fars
- County: Lamerd
- Bakhsh: Chah Varz
- Rural District: Chah Varz

Population (2006)
  - Total: 183
- Time zone: UTC+3:30 (IRST)
  - Summer (DST): UTC+4:30 (IRDT)

Deh Now-e Fazeli (Persian: ده نوفاضلي, also Romanized as Deh Now-e Fāẕelī and Dehno-e Fāẕelī) is a village in Sheykh Amer Rural District, in the Chah Varz District, Lamerd County, Fars province, Iran. At the 2006 census, its population was 183 between 44 families.
