= Leshgun =

Leshgun لشگون
- Village
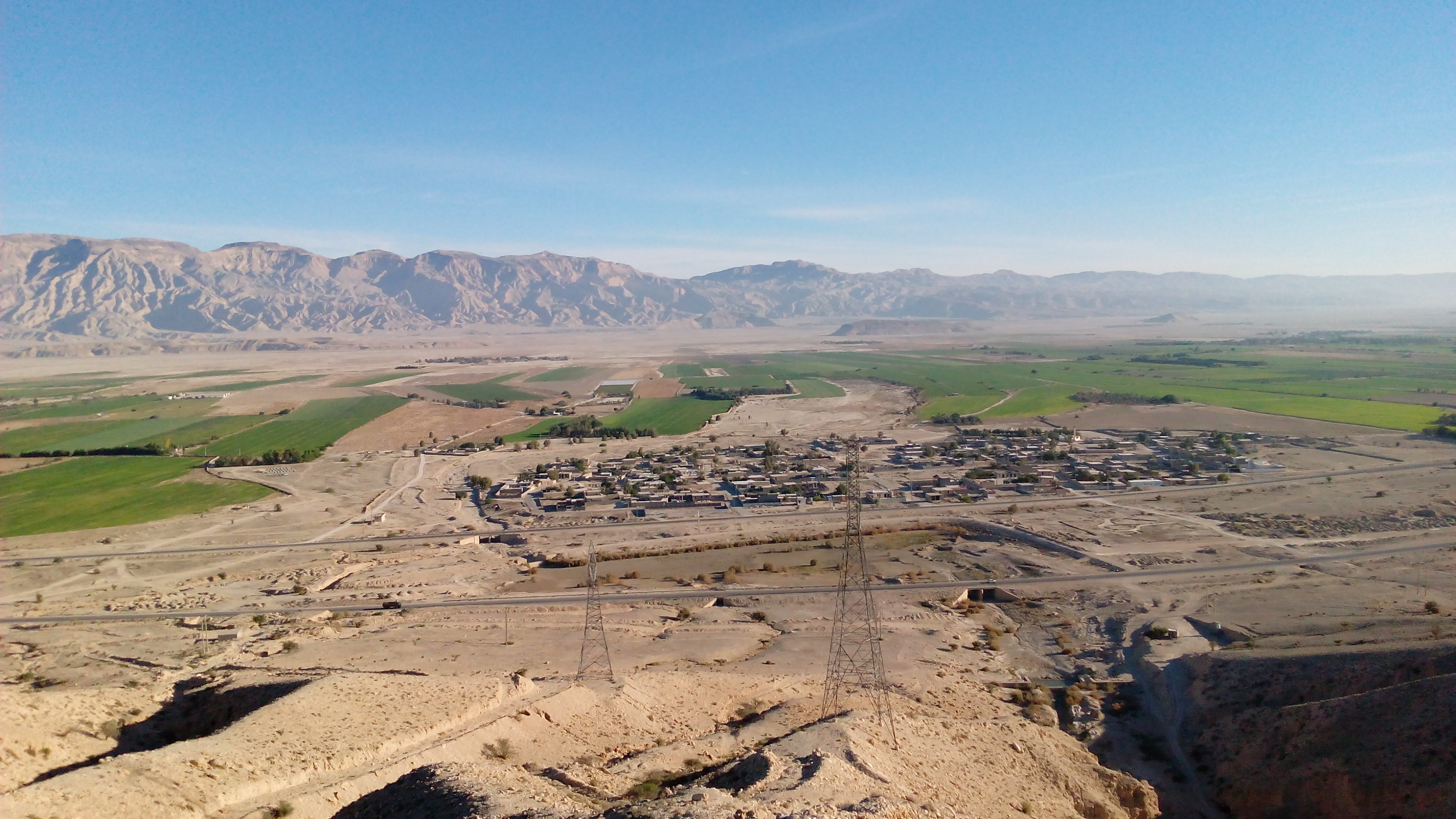

- Location within Iran
- Coordinates: 27°22′58″N 53°03′33″E
- Country: Iran
- Province: Fars
- County: Lamerd
- Bakhsh: Central
- Rural District: Howmeh

Population (2006)
  - Total: 378
- Time zone: UTC+3:30 (IRST)
  - Summer (DST): UTC+4:30 (IRDT)

Leshgun (Persian: لشگون, also Romanized as Leshgūn; also known as Lashkoon, Leshkān, Leshkūn, and Līshkūn) is a village in Howmeh Rural District, in the Central District of Lamerd County, Fars province, Iran. At the 2006 census, its population was 378, in 80 families.
