= Qaleh-ye Kachalha =

Qaleh-ye Kachalha قلعه كچلها
- Village
- Location within Iran
- Coordinates: 27°23′34″N 53°05′21″E
- Country: Iran
- Province: Fars
- County: Lamerd
- Bakhsh: Central
- Rural District: Howmeh

Population (2006)
  - Total: 293
- Time zone: UTC+3:30 (IRST)
  - Summer (DST): UTC+4:30 (IRDT)

Qaleh-ye Kachalha (Persian: قلعه كچلها, also Romanized as Qal‘eh-ye Kachalhā; also known as Kachahlā, Kachalhā, and Qal‘eh-ye Kachalān) is a village in Howmeh Rural District, in the Central District of Lamerd County, Fars province, Iran. At the 2006 census, its population was 293, in 69 families.
