= Navbandi =

Navbandi ناوبندي
- Village
- Location within Iran
- Coordinates: 27°22′50″N 53°04′35″E
- Country: Iran
- Province: Fars
- County: Lamerd
- Bakhsh: Central
- Rural District: Howmeh

Population (2006)
  - Total: 363
- Time zone: UTC+3:30 (IRST)
  - Summer (DST): UTC+4:30 (IRDT)

Navbandi (Persian: ناوبندي, also Romanized as Nāvbandī; also known as Nāybandī) is a village in Howmeh Rural District, in the Central District of Lamerd County, Fars province, Iran. At the 2006 census, its population was 363, in 83 families.
