= Qaleh-e Ali Baba =

Qaleh-e Ali Baba قلعه علي بابا
- Village
- Location within Iran
- Coordinates: 27°23′43″N 53°05′54″E
- Country: Iran
- Province: Fars
- County: Lamerd
- Bakhsh: Central
- Rural District: Howmeh

Population (2006)
  - Total: 133
- Time zone: UTC+3:30 (IRST)
  - Summer (DST): UTC+4:30 (IRDT)

Qaleh-e Ali Baba (Persian: قلعه علي بابا, also Romanized as Qal‘eh-ye 'Alī Bābā) is a village in Howmeh Rural District, in the Central District of Lamerd County, Fars province, Iran. At the 2006 census, its population was 133, in 31 families.
