= Chah Sheykh =

Chah Sheykh چاه شيخ
- Village
- Location within Iran
- Coordinates: 27°17′39″N 53°17′56″E
- Country: Iran
- Province: Fars
- County: Lamerd
- Bakhsh: Central
- Rural District: Sigar

Population (2006)
  - Total: 450
- Time zone: UTC+3:30 (IRST)
  - Summer (DST): UTC+4:30 (IRDT)

Chah Sheykh (Persian: چاه شيخ, also Romanized as Chāh Sheykh) is a village in Sigar Rural District, in the Central District of Lamerd County, Fars province, Iran. At the 2006 census, its population was 450, in 92 families.
