= Takhtabad =

Coordinates: 30.3000°N 57.7500°E

Takhtabad تخت اباد
- Village
- Interactive map of Takhtabad
- Country: Iran
- Province: Fars
- County: Lamerd
- Bakhsh: Central
- Rural District: Howmeh

Population (2006)
  - Total: 19
- Time zone: UTC+3:30 (IRST)
  - Summer (DST): UTC+4:30 (IRDT)

Takhtabad (Persian: تخت اباد, also Romanized as Takhtābād) is a village in Howmeh Rural District, in the Central District of Lamerd County, Fars province, Iran. At the 2006 census, its population was 19, in 7 families.
