= Dehban =

Dehban دهبان
- Village
- Location within Iran
- Coordinates: 27°26′08″N 53°25′31″E
- Country: Iran
- Province: Fars
- County: Lamerd
- Bakhsh: Central
- District: chahvarz District

Population (2006)
  - Total: 387
- Time zone: UTC+3:30 (IRST)
  - Summer (DST): UTC+4:30 (IRDT)

Dehban (Persian: دهبان, also Romanized as Dehbān) is a village in chahvarz District, in the Central District of Lamerd County, Fars province, Iran. At the 2006 census, its population was 387, in 90 families.
