= Nurai-ye Now =

Nurai-ye Now نورائي نو
- Village
- Location within Iran
- Coordinates: 27°21′42″N 53°08′50″E
- Country: Iran
- Province: Fars
- County: Lamerd
- Bakhsh: Central
- Rural District: Howmeh

Population (2006)
  - Total: 557
- Time zone: UTC+3:30 (IRST)
  - Summer (DST): UTC+4:30 (IRDT)

Nurai-ye Now (Persian: نورائي نو, also Romanized as Nūrā’ī-ye Now; also known as Nīrā’ī, Nīrā’ī-ye Bālā, and Nūrā’ī) is a village in Howmeh Rural District, in the Central District of Lamerd County, Fars province, Iran. At the 2006 census, its population was 557, in 117 families.
