= Hasan-e Kamali =

Hasan-e Kamali حسن كمالي
- Village
- Location within Iran
- Coordinates: 27°18′59″N 53°15′14″E
- Country: Iran
- Province: Fars
- County: Lamerd
- Bakhsh: Central
- Rural District: Sigar

Population (2006)
  - Total: 308
- Time zone: UTC+3:30 (IRST)
  - Summer (DST): UTC+4:30 (IRDT)

Hasan-e Kamali (Persian: حسن كمالي, also Romanized as Ḩasan-e Kamālī; also known as Ḩajiḩasan-e Kamālī) is a village in Sigar Rural District, in the Central District of Lamerd County, Fars province, Iran. At the 2006 census, its population was 308, in 75 families.
