= Mohseni =

Mohseni is a surname. Notable people with the surname include:

- Adela Mohseni, Afghan women's rights activist
- Ahmad Mohseni Garakani (born 1926), Iranian religious leader and politician
- Asif Mohseni (1935–2019), Afghan religious leader
- Gholam-Hossein Mohseni-Eje'i (born 1956), Iranian politician, jurist and prosecutor
- Nasruddin Mohseni, Afghan politician
- Nastaran Mohseni (born 1992), Iranian film director and cartoonist
- Saad Mohseni, Afghan Australian businessman
- Shirin Mohseni (born 1980), Afghan politician
- Zaid Mohseni (born 1969), Afghan businessman

== See also ==
- Ali Mohseni, village in Fars, Iran
- Karbalayi Mohseni, village in Fars, Iran
