= Qaleh-ye Hajji Mohammad =

Qaleh-ye Hajji Mohammad قلعه حاجي محمد
- Village
- Location within Iran
- Coordinates: 27°23′25″N 53°06′40″E
- Country: Iran
- Province: Fars
- County: Lamerd
- Bakhsh: Central
- Rural District: Howmeh

Population (2006)
  - Total: 30
- Time zone: UTC+3:30 (IRST)
  - Summer (DST): UTC+4:30 (IRDT)

Qaleh-ye Hajji Mohammad (Persian: قلعه حاجي محمد, also Romanized as Qal‘eh-ye Ḩājjī Moḩammad and Qal‘eh-e Ḩājjī Mohammad; also known as Birkeh Hāji, Ghal‘eh Haji Mohammad, Qal‘eh-e 'ājjī, Qal’eh Hāji, and Qal‘eh Ḩājj Moḩammad) is a village in Howmeh Rural District, in the Central District of Lamerd County, Fars province, Iran. At the 2006 census, its population was 30, in 7 families.
