= Seh Tonbak =

Seh Tonbak سه تنبك
- Village
- Location within Iran
- Coordinates: 27°16′48″N 53°20′18″E
- Country: Iran
- Province: Fars
- County: Lamerd
- Bakhsh: Central
- Rural District: Sigar

Population (2006)
  - Total: 349
- Time zone: UTC+3:30 (IRST)
  - Summer (DST): UTC+4:30 (IRDT)

Seh Tonbak (Persian: سه تنبك, also Romanized as Setonbak) is a village in Sigar Rural District, in the Central District of Lamerd County, Fars province, Iran. At the 2006 census, its population was 349, in 79 families.
