= Qaleh Gholam Abdollah =

Qaleh Gholam Abdollah قلعه غلام عبداله
- Village
- Location within Iran
- Coordinates: 27°22′40″N 53°08′12″E
- Country: Iran
- Province: Fars
- County: Lamerd
- Bakhsh: Central
- Rural District: Howmeh

Population (2006)
  - Total: 112
- Time zone: UTC+3:30 (IRST)
  - Summer (DST): UTC+4:30 (IRDT)

Qaleh Gholam Abdollah (Persian: قلعه غلام عبداله, also Romanized as Qal‘eh Gholām 'Abdollāh; also known as Gholām 'Abdollāhī) is a village in Howmeh Rural District, in the Central District of Lamerd County, Fars province, Iran. At the 2006 census, its population was 112, in 27 families.
