= Qaleh-ye Esmaili =

Qaleh-ye Esmaili قلعه اسماعيلي
- Village
- Location within Iran
- Coordinates: 27°24′33″N 53°05′18″E
- Country: Iran
- Province: Fars
- County: Lamerd
- Bakhsh: Central
- Rural District: Howmeh

Population (2006)
  - Total: 78
- Time zone: UTC+3:30 (IRST)
  - Summer (DST): UTC+4:30 (IRDT)

Qaleh-ye Esmaili (Persian: قلعه اسماعيلي, also Romanized as Qal‘eh-ye Esmā‘īlī) is a village in Howmeh Rural District, in the Central District of Lamerd County, Fars province, Iran. At the 2006 census, its population was 78, in 21 families.
