= Tahrehdan =

Tahrehdan تهره دان
- Village
- Location within Iran
- Coordinates: 27°16′22″N 53°33′50″E
- Country: Iran
- Province: Fars
- County: Lamerd
- Bakhsh: Eshkanan
- Rural District: Eshkanan

Population (2006)
  - Total: 8
- Time zone: UTC+3:30 (IRST)
  - Summer (DST): UTC+4:30 (IRDT)

Tahrehdan (Persian: تهره دان, also Romanized as Tahrehdān; also known as Tahredān, Tahrezān, and Tahr Rāneh) is a village in Eshkanan Rural District, Eshkanan District, Lamerd County, Fars province, Iran. At the 2006 census, its population was 8, in 5 families.
