= Chokhuha =

Chokhuha چخوها
- Village
- Location within Iran
- Coordinates: 27°24′43″N 53°06′54″E
- Country: Iran
- Province: Fars
- County: Lamerd
- Bakhsh: Central
- Rural District: Howmeh

Population (2006)
  - Total: 92
- Time zone: UTC+3:30 (IRST)
  - Summer (DST): UTC+4:30 (IRDT)

Chokhuha (Persian: چخوها, also Romanized as Chokhūhā; also known as Choghūhā, Chūkhehhā, and Qal‘eh-e Mūdū) is a village in Howmeh Rural District, in the Central District of Lamerd County, Fars province, Iran. At the 2006 census, its population was 92, in 23 families.
