= Korezar =

Korezar كرزار
- Village
- Location within Iran
- Coordinates: 27°21′45″N 53°21′22″E
- Country: Iran
- Province: Fars
- County: Lamerd
- Bakhsh: Central
- Rural District: Sigar

Population (2006)
  - Total: 157
- Time zone: UTC+3:30 (IRST)
  - Summer (DST): UTC+4:30 (IRDT)

Korezar (Persian: كرزار, also Romanized as Korezār; also known as Kareh Za, Kerezā, Koreh Zār, and Korezā) is a village in Sigar Rural District, in the Central District of Lamerd County, Fars province, Iran. At the 2006 census, its population was 157, in 28 families.
