= Anda, Iran =

Anda اندا
- village
- Location within Iran
- Coordinates: 27°13′12″N 53°28′48″E
- Country: Iran
- Province: Fars
- County: Lamerd
- Bakhsh: Eshkanan
- Rural District: Eshkanan

Population (2006)
  - Total: 12
- Time zone: UTC+3:30 (IRST)
  - Summer (DST): UTC+4:30 (IRDT)
- ISO 3166 code: IRN

Anda (Persian: اندا, also Romanized as Āndā) is a village in Eshkanan Rural District, Eshkanan District, Lamerd County, Fars province, Iran. At the 2006 census, its population was 12, in 6 families.
