= Khalu Mohammad Ali =

Khalu Mohammad Ali خالومحمدعلي
- Village
- Location within Iran
- Coordinates: 27°18′50″N 53°15′24″E
- Country: Iran
- Province: Fars
- County: Lamerd
- Bakhsh: Central
- Rural District: Sigar

Population (2006)
  - Total: 418
- Time zone: UTC+3:30 (IRST)
  - Summer (DST): UTC+4:30 (IRDT)

Khalu Mohammad Ali (Persian: خالومحمدعلي, also Romanized as Khālū Moḩammad 'Alī; also known as Khālū Moḩammad) is a village in Sigar Rural District, in the Central District of Lamerd County, Fars province, Iran. At the 2006 census, its population was 418, in 103 families.
