= Pangaru =

Pangaru پنگرو
- Village
- Location within Iran
- Coordinates: 27°14′31″N 53°23′38″E
- Country: Iran
- Province: Fars
- County: Lamerd
- Bakhsh: Central
- Rural District: Sigar

Population (2006)
  - Total: 797
- Time zone: UTC+3:30 (IRST)
  - Summer (DST): UTC+4:30 (IRDT)

Pangaru (Persian: پنگرو, also Romanized as Pangarū and Pangroo) is a village in Sigar Rural District, in the Central District of Lamerd County, Fars province, Iran. In the 2006 census, the population was 797, including 165 families.
