= Qaleh Mozaffary =

Qaleh Mozaffary قلعه مظفری
- Village
- Location within Iran
- Coordinates: 27°22′15″N 53°06′23″E
- Country: Iran
- Province: Fars
- County: Lamerd
- Bakhsh: Central
- Rural District: Howmeh

Population (2006)
  - Total: 89
- Time zone: UTC+3:30 (IRST)
  - Summer (DST): UTC+4:30 (IRDT)

Qaleh Mozaffary (Persian: قلعه مظفری, also Romanized as Qal‘eh Moz̧affary; also known as Ghal‘eh Mozaffar, Qal‘eh-e Moz̧affar, and Qal‘eh Moz̧affar) is a village in Howmeh Rural District, in the Central District of Lamerd County, Fars province, Iran. At the 2006 census, its population was 89, in 18 families.
