= Kamur Sukhteh =

Kamur Sukhteh كمورسوخته
- Village
- Location within Iran
- Coordinates: 27°22′32″N 53°07′27″E
- Country: Iran
- Province: Fars
- County: Lamerd
- Bakhsh: Central
- Rural District: Howmeh

Population (2006)
  - Total: 31
- Time zone: UTC+3:30 (IRST)
  - Summer (DST): UTC+4:30 (IRDT)

Kamur Sukhteh (Persian: كمورسوخته, also Romanized as Kamūr Sūkhteh; also known as Kahūr Sūkhteh) is a village in Howmeh Rural District, in the Central District of Lamerd County, Fars province, Iran. At the 2006 census, its population was 31, in 6 families.
