= Mollai =

Mollai ملائي
- Village
- Location within Iran
- Coordinates: 27°19′38″N 53°14′24″E
- Country: Iran
- Province: Fars
- County: Lamerd
- Bakhsh: Central
- Rural District: Sigar

Population (2006)
  - Total: 99
- Time zone: UTC+3:30 (IRST)
  - Summer (DST): UTC+4:30 (IRDT)

Mollai (Persian: ملائي, also Romanized as Mollā’ī; also known as Maḩalleh-ye Mollā’ī) is a village in Sigar Rural District, in the Central District of Lamerd County, Fars province, Iran. At the 2006 census, its population was 99, in 20 families.
