= Sigar-e Bala =

Village in Fars province, Iran

Sigar-e Bala Persian: سيگاربالا
- Village
- Location within Iran
- Coordinates: 27°17′13″N 53°18′54″E
- Country: Iran
- Province: Fars
- County: Lamerd
- District: Central
- Rural District: Sigar

Population (2016)
  - Total: 1,467
- Time zone: UTC+3:30 (IRST)

Sigar-e Bala (Persian: سيگاربالا,) (Note: Also romanized as Sigar Bala and Sīgār-e Bālā; also known as Sīgār, Sīgār-e ‘Olyā, Sīgār-e Pā’īn, and Sīgār-e Soflá) is a village in, and the capital of, Sigar Rural District of the Central District of Lamerd County, Fars province, Iran.

== Demographics ==
=== Population ===
At the time of the 2006 National Census, the village's population was 1,078 in 243 households. The following census in 2011 counted 1,241 people in 340 households. The 2016 census measured the population of the village as 1,467 people in 404 households. It was the most populous village in its rural district.
