= Pas Band =

Pas Band or Pasband (Persian: پس بند) may refer to:

- Pas Band, Fars
- Pas Band, Hormozgan
