= Qaedi-ye Seh =

Qaedi-ye Seh قائدي3
- Village
- Location within Iran
- Coordinates: 27°19′42″N 53°14′11″E
- Country: Iran
- Province: Fars
- County: Lamerd
- Bakhsh: Central
- Rural District: Sigar

Population (2006)
  - Total: 89
- Time zone: UTC+3:30 (IRST)
  - Summer (DST): UTC+4:30 (IRDT)

Qaedi-ye Seh (Persian: قائدي3, also Romanized as Qā’edī-ye Seh; also known as Chāh Qā’edī, Maḩalleh-ye Qā’edī, Qā’edī, Qāyed, and Qāyedī) is a village in Sigar Rural District, in the Central District of Lamerd County, Fars province, Iran. At the 2006 census, its population was 89, in 20 families.
