= Khasht, Lamerd =

Khasht خشت
- Village
- Location within Iran
- Coordinates: 27°14′05″N 53°26′07″E
- Country: Iran
- Province: Fars
- County: Lamerd
- Bakhsh: Eshkanan
- Rural District: Eshkanan

Population (2006)
  - Total: 851
- Time zone: UTC+3:30 (IRST)
  - Summer (DST): UTC+4:30 (IRDT)

Khasht (Persian: خشت, also Romanized as Khesht) is a village in Eshkanan Rural District, Eshkanan District, Lamerd County, Fars province, Iran. At the 2006 census, its population was 851, in 177 families.
