= Pas Band, Fars =

Pas Band پس بند
- Village
- Location within Iran
- Coordinates: 27°08′58″N 53°48′18″E
- Country: Iran
- Province: Fars
- County: Lamerd
- Bakhsh: Eshkanan
- Rural District: Kal

Population (2006)
  - Total: 620
- Time zone: UTC+3:30 (IRST)
  - Summer (DST): UTC+4:30 (IRDT)

Pas Band (Persian: پس بند, also Romanized as Pasband) is a village in Kal Rural District, Eshkanan District, Lamerd County, Fars province, Iran. At the 2006 census, its population was 620, in 151 families.
