= Shirinu, Fars =

Shirinu شيرينو
- Village
- Location within Iran
- Coordinates: 27°29′22″N 53°18′35″E
- Country: Iran
- Province: Fars
- County: Lamerd
- Bakhsh: Central
- Rural District: Chah Varz

Population (2006)
  - Total: 380
- Time zone: UTC+3:30 (IRST)
  - Summer (DST): UTC+4:30 (IRDT)

Shirinu (Persian: شيرينو, also Romanized as Shīrīnū and Shirinoo) is a village in Chah Varz Rural District, in the Central District of Lamerd County, Fars province, Iran. At the 2006 census, its population was 380, in 74 families.
