= Khalifeh Ha =

Khalifeh Ha or Khalifehha (Persian: خليفه ها) may refer to:

- Khalifehha, Fars
- Khalifeh Ha, Kermanshah
