= Lavar Khesht =

Village in Fars province, Iran

Lavar Khesht Persian: لاورخشت
- Village
- Location within Iran
- Coordinates: 27°08′40″N 53°26′59″E
- Country: Iran
- Province: Fars
- County: Lamerd
- District: Eshkanan
- Rural District: Eshkanan

Population (2016)
  - Total: 1,163
- Time zone: UTC+3:30 (IRST)

Lavar Khesht (Persian: لاورخشت) (Note: Also romanized as Lāvar Khesht) is a village in Eshkanan Rural District of Eshkanan District, Lamerd County, Fars province, Iran.

== Demographics ==
=== Population ===
At the time of the 2006 National Census, the village's population was 1,042 in 236 households. The following census in 2011 counted 1,182 people in 290 households. The 2016 census measured the population of the village as 1,163 people in 329 households. It was the most populous village in its rural district.
