= Fazeli =

Fazeli may refer to:

- Fazeli, Iran, a village in Fars Province
- Reza Fazeli, Iranian actor
- Hossein Martin Fazeli, Iranian Canadian film director
