= Khalifehha, Fars =

Khalifehha خليفه ها
- Village
- Location within Iran
- Coordinates: 27°25′46″N 53°12′38″E
- Country: Iran
- Province: Fars
- County: Lamerd
- Bakhsh: Central
- Rural District: Howmeh

Population (2006)
  - Total: 164
- Time zone: UTC+3:30 (IRST)
  - Summer (DST): UTC+4:30 (IRDT)

Khalifehha (Persian: خليفه ها, also Romanized as Khalīfehhā) is a village in Howmeh Rural District, in the Central District of Lamerd County, Fars province, Iran. At the 2006 census, its population was 164, in 32 families.
