= Beryu, Iran =

Beryu بريو
- Village
- Location within Iran
- Coordinates: 27°14′29″N 53°29′29″E
- Country: Iran
- Province: Fars
- County: Lamerd
- Bakhsh: Eshkanan
- Rural District: Eshkanan

Population (2006)
  - Total: 336
- Time zone: UTC+3:30 (IRST)
  - Summer (DST): UTC+4:30 (IRDT)

Beryu (Persian: بريو, also Romanized as Beryū, Berioo, and Berīū) is a village in Eshkanan Rural District, Eshkanan District, Lamerd County, Fars province, Iran. At the 2006 census, its population was 336, in 65 families.
