= Kherreh, Fars =

Kherreh خره
- Village
- Location within Iran
- Coordinates: 27°18′59″N 53°14′47″E
- Country: Iran
- Province: Fars
- County: Lamerd
- Bakhsh: Central
- Rural District: Sigar

Population (2006)
  - Total: 528
- Time zone: UTC+3:30 (IRST)
  - Summer (DST): UTC+4:30 (IRDT)

Kherreh (Persian: خره) is a village in Sigar Rural District, in the Central District of Lamerd County, Fars province, Iran. At the 2006 census, its population was 528, in 131 families.
