= Dasht-e Gur, Fars =

Dasht-e Gur دشت گور
- Village
- Location within Iran
- Coordinates: 27°14′42″N 53°33′58″E
- Country: Iran
- Province: Fars
- County: Lamerd
- Bakhsh: Eshkanan
- Rural District: Eshkanan

Population (2006)
  - Total: 50
- Time zone: UTC+3:30 (IRST)
  - Summer (DST): UTC+4:30 (IRDT)

Dasht-e Gur (Persian: دشت گور, also Romanized as Dasht-e Gūr; also known as Dasht-e Kowr and Dasht-e Kūr) is a village in Eshkanan Rural District, Eshkanan District, Lamerd County, Fars province, Iran. At the 2006 census, its population was 50, in 8 families.
