= Kal, Fars =

Village in Fars province, Iran

Kal Persian: كال
- Village
- Location within Iran
- Coordinates: 27°14′42″N 53°48′54″E
- Country: Iran
- Province: Fars
- County: Lamerd
- District: Eshkanan
- Rural District: Kal

Population (2016)
  - Total: 1,801
- Time zone: UTC+3:30 (IRST)

Kal (Persian: كال) (Note: Also romanized as Kāl) is a village in, and the capital of, Kal Rural District of Eshkanan District, Lamerd County, Fars province, Iran.

== Demographics ==
=== Population ===
At the time of the 2006 National Census, the village's population was 1,696 in 331 households. The following census in 2011 counted 1,896 people in 443 households. The 2016 census measured the population of the village as 1,801 people in 489 households. It was the most populous village in its rural district.
