= Tarman =

Village in Fars province, Iran

Tarman Persian: ترمان
- Village
- Location within Iran
- Coordinates: 27°22′37″N 53°05′32″E
- Country: Iran
- Province: Fars
- County: Lamerd
- District: Central
- Rural District: Howmeh

Population (2016)
  - Total: 657
- Time zone: UTC+3:30 (IRST)

Tarman (Persian: ترمان) (Note: Also romanized as Tarmān, Termān, and Tormān) is a village in, and the capital of, Howmeh Rural District of the Central District of Lamerd County, Fars province, Iran.

== Demographics ==
=== Population ===
At the time of the 2006 National Census, the village's population was 616 in 127 households. The following census in 2011 counted 592 people in 155 households. The 2016 census measured the population of the village as 657 people in 192 households. It was the most populous village in its rural district.
