= Qaedi =

Qaedi or Qayedi (Persian: قايدي) may refer to:

- Qaedi, Jam, Bushehr Province
- Qaedi, Tangestan, Bushehr Province
- Qaedi, Fars
