= Fazeli, Iran =

Dehno Fazeli دهنو فاضلي
- Village
- Location within Iran
- Coordinates: 27°27′41″N 53°22′18″E
- Country: Iran
- Province: Fars
- County: Lamerd
- Bakhsh: Central
- Rural District: Chah Varz

Population (2006)
  - Total: 137
- Time zone: UTC+3:30 (IRST)
  - Summer (DST): UTC+4:30 (IRDT)

Dehno Fazeli (Persian: دهنوفاضلي, also Romanized as Dehno Fazeli) is a village in Chah Varz Rural District, in the Central District of Lamerd County, Fars province, Iran. At the 2006 census, its population was 137, in 33 families.
