= Karbalayi Mohseni =

Karbalayi Mohseni كربلائي محسني
- Village
- Country: Iran
- Province: Fars
- County: Lamerd
- Bakhsh: Central
- Rural District: Sigar

Population (2006)
  - Total: 37
- Time zone: UTC+3:30 (IRST)
  - Summer (DST): UTC+4:30 (IRDT)

Karbalayi Mohseni (Persian: كربلائي محسني, also Romanized as Karbalāyī Moḩsenī) is a village in Sigar Rural District, in the Central District of Lamerd County, Fars province, Iran. At the 2006 census, its population was 37, in 8 families.
