= Deh Kohneh, Lamerd =

Deh Kohneh ده كهنه
- Village
- Location within Iran
- Coordinates: 27°28′07″N 53°21′30″E
- Country: Iran
- Province: Fars
- County: Lamerd
- Bakhsh: Central
- Rural District: Chah Varz

Population (2006)
  - Total: 201
- Time zone: UTC+3:30 (IRST)
  - Summer (DST): UTC+4:30 (IRDT)

Deh Kohneh (Persian: ده كهنه) is a village in Chah Varz Rural District, in the Central District of Lamerd County, Fars province, Iran. At the 2006 census, its population was 201, in 42 families.
