= Kudian, Lamerd =

Kudian كوديان
- Village
- Location within Iran
- Coordinates: 27°09′59″N 53°45′47″E
- Country: Iran
- Province: Fars
- County: Lamerd
- Bakhsh: Eshkanan
- Rural District: Kal

Population (2006)
  - Total: 777
- Time zone: UTC+3:30 (IRST)
  - Summer (DST): UTC+4:30 (IRDT)

Kudian (Persian: كوديان, also Romanized as Kūdīān; also known as Ahel, Ahl, Ehel, Kadīūn, Kodīān, Kodnān, and Kodyān) is a village in Kal Rural District, Eshkanan District, Lamerd County, Fars province, Iran. At the 2006 census, its population was 777, in 174 families.
