= Sheykh Amer Rural District =

Rural district in Fars province, Iran

Sheykh Amer Rural District Persian: دهستان شیخ عامر
- Rural District
- Location within Iran
- Coordinates: 27°28′23″N 53°20′54″E
- Country: Iran
- Province: Fars
- County: Lamerd
- District: Chah Varz
- Capital: Sheykh Amer

Population (2016)
  - Total: 2,829
- Time zone: UTC+3:30 (IRST)

Sheykh Amer Rural District (Persian: دهستان شیخ عامر) is in Chah Varz District of Lamerd County, Fars province, Iran. Its capital is the village of Sheykh Amer.

== History ==
In 2013, Chah Varz Rural District was separated from the Central District in the formation of Chah Varz District, and Sheykh Amer Rural District was created in the new district.

== Demographics ==
=== Population ===
At the time of the 2016 National Census, the rural district's population was 2,829 in 782 households. The most populous of its 10 villages was Sheykh Amer, with 1,239 people.
