= Hamid Amini =

Iranian-Norwergian engineer (1980–2026)

- حمید امینی
- Born: Hamid Amini; 27 March 1980; Lamerd, Iran
- Died: 28 February 2026 (aged 45); Lamerd, Iran
- Cause of death: 2026 Lamerd sports hall attack by US
- Burial place: Lamerd
- Citizenship: Iranian, Norwegian
- Education: PhD
- Occupation: Principal Mechanical Engineer
- Years active: 2000–2026
- Employer: DNV
- Known for: Fluid dynamics and simulation of fluid regimes
- Notable work: Norwegian-German substantial projects at DNV
- Spouse: Zahra Ghaedi

Hamid Amini (27 March 1980 – 28 February 2026) was an Iranian residing in Norway and a principal fluid mechanical engineer specializing in hydrodynamics at Det Norske Veritas (DNV). Amini was killed in an airstrike in controversial Lamerd attack in Iran, while visiting the country with his family. He was the only European citizen killed during the US-Israeli war on Iran in 2026 and the circumstances around the attack, made him a very frequent subject of media coverage in Norway, including the Norwegian state television NRK and Norwegian newspapers namely Budstikka, VG, NRK website, Trade Winds, Dagbladet and also international media including New York Times.

== Early life and career ==
Amini was born and raised in Lamerd in Fars province, Iran. He moved to Norway in 2007 to pursue doctoral studies at the Norwegian University of Science and Technology (NTNU) in Trondheim. He completed a doctorate in hydrodynamics and joined DNV in 2011.

During his career at DNV, Amini worked in Norway and Germany and became a principal engineer in the company's maritime business. DNV described him after his death as a highly valued and respected long-term colleague.

Amini became a Norwegian citizen and lived in the Løren neighborhood of Oslo with his wife, Zahra Ghaedi, and their son, who was born in 2025. VG, the most circulated tabloid and newspaper in Norway, had exclusive interview with Hamid's wife and a broad coverage of the story.

== Death ==
Amini and his family travelled to Iran in 2025. He subsequently returned to Iran while taking parental leave. On 28 February 2026, Amini and his wife were in Lamerd when the city was struck during the conflict involving Iran, the United States and Israel.

Amini was seriously wounded after an explosion near their vehicle. His wife was also injured. Amini was taken to hospital but died from his injuries later that day, aged 45. Medical imaging subsequently examined by VG showed metallic fragments in his head.

DNV confirmed his death on 3 March, saying that he had been killed in connection with an airstrike on Lamerd during a private trip to Iran.

=== Investigation of the strike ===
In August 2026, VG published an investigation into the strike, based on video footage, medical evidence and assessments by missile experts. The newspaper reported that the weapon was most likely a US-made Precision Strike Missile (PrSM). Experts consulted by VG said characteristics visible in footage of the weapon and the effects of the explosions were consistent with a PrSM equipped with a fragmentation warhead.

United States Central Command (CENTCOM), however, denied that US forces had attacked Lamerd on 28 February and suggested that imagery from the attack could show an Iranian Hoveyzeh cruise missile. Experts interviewed by VG disputed that identification. VG was unable to conclusively establish what the intended target was but Lars Peder Haga, the military expert in the research, clearly stated that the missile was an American PrSM based on the visual evidence and the records from witness including Hamid's wife.

== Reaction on the death ==
The circumstances around Hamid Amini's death ignited hot discussions in Norwegian media about the support of military actions led by US-Israel, and also the definition of a "Norwegian" person.

- Actors with sympathy with global South such as FOR strongly condemned the Norwegian contribution in US military activities and called upon Norwegian authorities to vocally condemn the killing of Hamid Amini as a civil casualty and a Norwegian citizen.
- Right-wing politicians such as Espen Teigen reacted on calling Hamid a 'Norwegian' person, stating that he was not an ethnic Norwegian and he was originally from Iran.
- Moderate politicians such as Carl S. Bjurstedt and Eivind Traedal comdemmned the reaction of right wings, stating that Hamid Amini was a Norwegian person killed tragically in a vacation with family and that this kind of reactions is to spread hate. Some of the critics even Farouk Al Kasim showing that foreigner significantly contributed to the success of the Norwegian society.
- In September 2026, a report from the special rapporteur from the Human Rights Committee of UN confirmed that the United States has committed war crimes in at least two attacks on the first day of the war on Iran to Minab and Lamerd, including the one leading to the death of Hamid Amini.
