= Shirinu =

Shirinu or Shirinnu or Shirino or Shirinoo (Persian: شيرينو) may refer to:

- Shirinu, Bushehr
- Shirinu, Fars
