= Kudian =

Kudian or Kudeyan (Persian: كوديان) may refer to:

- Kudian, Lamerd
- Kudian, Marvdasht
- Kudian, Shiraz
