= Ahmad Akbarpour =

Iranian writer

احمد اکبرپور Ahmad Akbarpour
- Born: July 31, 1970 (age 56)
- Education: Shahid Beheshti University
- Occupations: Author of short fiction, poetry, children's books
- Writing career
- Language: Persian
- Notable works: The Train of That Night Good Night Commander! Emperor of Words
- Notable awards: Yearbook of Iranian Minister of Culture; IBBY honor list
- Website: Personal website (English)

Ahmad Akbarpour (Persian: احمد اکبرپور) Ahmad Akbarpūr Persian pronunciation: [æhˈmæd(-e) ækbærpuːr], born July 31, 1970, in Chah Varz, Lamerd, Fars province, is a novelist and author of short stories and children's books.

== Biography ==
Ahmad Akbarpour was born on 31 July 1970 in Chah Varz. He got his BA in psychology from Shahid Beheshti University in Tehran.

Ahmad Akbarpour started his literary career at the age of 24 by composing poetry. He published his first and only collection of poetry, People of the Thursday Evening, in 1993.

A student of Reza Barahani and Houshang Golshiri, he soon started writing fiction for adolescents, adopting a postmodern style of writing.

== Books ==
That Night’s Train, published in 1999, received the Book of the Year award from Iran's Ministry of Culture. The novel narrates the story of a little girl who recently lost her mother and meets with a teacher during a train trip. This short novel was adapted as a TV film by Hamid Reza Hafezi and later as a movie by Hamid Reza Ghotbi.

Published in 2002, Good Night Commander was financially supported jointly by UNICEF and Iran's Children's Book Council. This children's anti-war book tells the story of a maimed child who meets with an enemy toy soldier in his dreams.

== Themes ==
During his career, Akbarpour discussed such topics as fear, loneliness, and peace. In some of his works as If I Were a Pilot, Good Night Commander, and Emperor of Words he shows his disdain for the destructive impact of war on children.

== Translations ==
Good Night Commander and That Night’s Train (illustrated by Isabelle Arsenault) was published in English by Groundwood Books in the United States and Canada in 2010 and 2012 respectively.

== Bibliography ==
=== Poetry ===
Year	Original Persian	English Translation
1993	Mardoman-e Asr-e Panjshanbeh	People of Thursday's Evening

=== Youth books ===
Year	Original Persian	English Translation
1997	Donyay-ye Goushe-o-Kenar-e Daftaram	The World of My Notebook Margins
1998	Ghatar-e An Shab	That Night's Train
2001	Vaghti Narahat Bashim, Jadeha Tamam Nemishavand	The Roads Don't Finish, When We Are Sad
2002	Emperatur-e Kalamat	Emperor of Words
2003	Shab Bekheyr Farmandeh!	Good Night Commander!
2003	Man Nokar-e Baba Nistam	I'm Not My Dad's Servant
2006	Dokhtari Saket ba Parandeha-yi Sholough	A Silenced Girl with Noisy Birds
2006	Agar Man Khalaban Boudam	If I Was a Pilot
2005	Ro'yahay-e Jonoubi	Southern Dreams
2010	Ghoul va Docharkheh	Giant and Bicycle

=== Short Story ===
Year	Original Persian	English Translation
2001	Agahiy-e Nashr-e Alef	The Ads of Alef Publisher

== Awards ==
- Honor list of IBBY 2006: The Emperor of Words
