= Khesht (disambiguation) =

Khesht is a city in Fars Province, Iran.

Khesht or Khasht (Persian: خشت) may also refer to:

- Khasht, Lamerd, Fars Province
- Khesht, Razavi Khorasan
- Khesht District, in Fars Province
- Khesht Rural District, in Fars Province
