= Muqali =

General and companion of Genghis Khan

- Мухулай
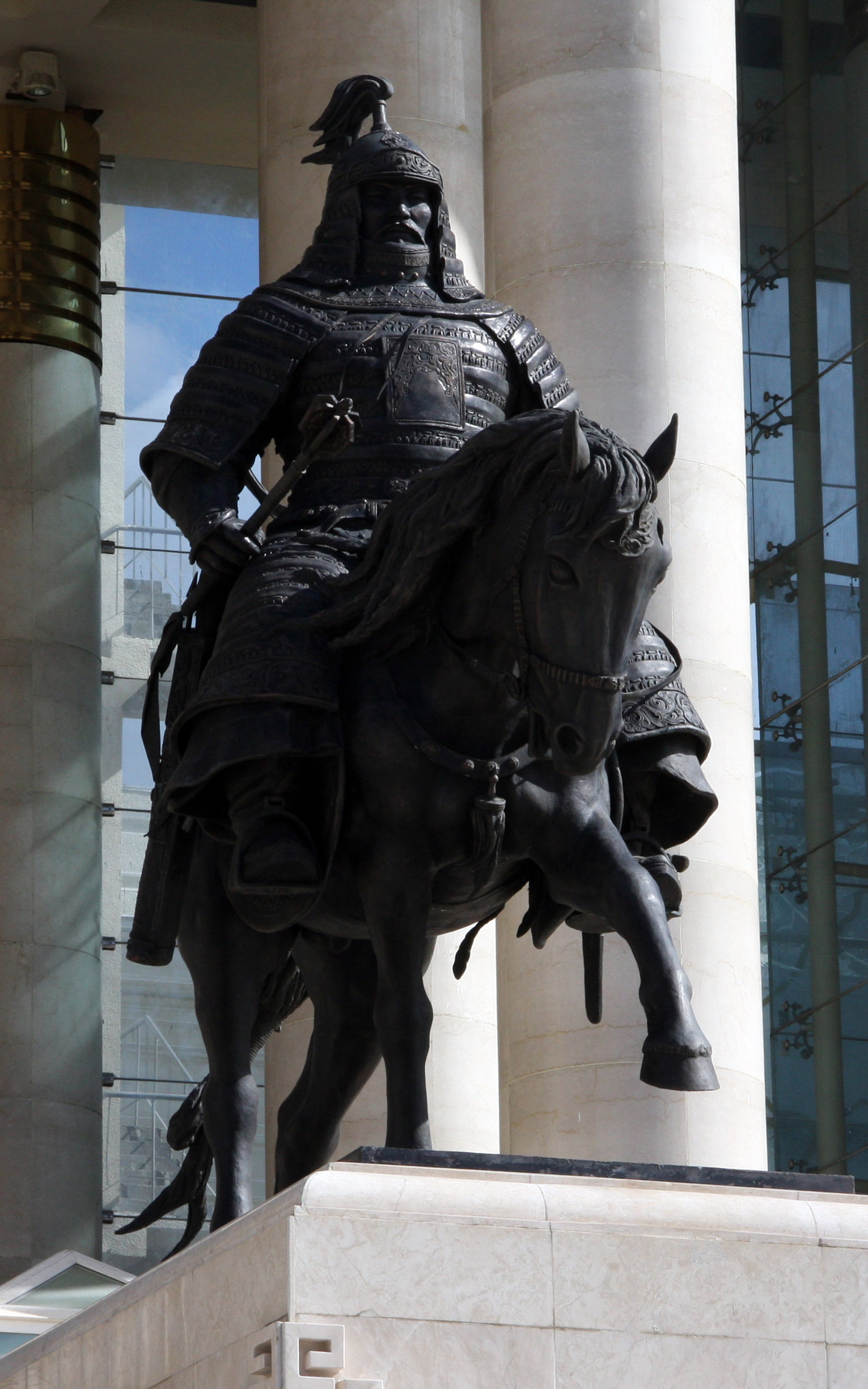
- Born: 1170
- Died: 1223 (aged 52–53)
- Other names: Mukhali; Mukhulai
- Military career
- Allegiance: Mongol Empire
- Service years: Pre-1206 – 1223
- Conflicts: Mongol conquest of the Jin dynasty

Muqali
- Traditional Chinese: 木華黎
- Simplified Chinese: 木华黎
Transcriptions
Standard Mandarin
- Hanyu Pinyin: Mùhuálí

Muqali (Mongolian: Мухулай; 1170–1223), also spelt Mukhali and Mukhulai, was a Mongol general who became a trusted and esteemed commander under Genghis Khan. The son of Gü'ün U'a, a Jalair leader who had sworn fealty to the Mongols, he became known by his epithet "Muqali" ('one who dulls'), earned through his committed and able service to the Great Khan and the Mongol Empire.

During the invasion of Jin China, Muqali acted as Genghis Khan's second-in-command, was promoted to Viceroy of China, and was entrusted with a great degree of autonomy once Genghis Khan departed to conquer Central Asia. Unlike many Mongol leaders who were willing to massacre to gain any advantage, Muqali usually attempted to convert foes into friends by more conciliatory means.

By the time of Ogedei's reign (1229–1241), he was viewed as the best of the extraordinarily talented pool of Mongol generals. Given his undefeated record despite very limited resources, he might be regarded as the greatest military commander in history. He was "unquestionably one of the leading Mongol personalities and a supreme leader". His wisdom in dealing with local matters has been emphasized.

== Life ==
Muqali, third son of Gü'ün U'a, was born into the 'White' clan of the Jalair tribe, who had been the hereditary serfs of the Borjigin Mongols. Originally associated with the Jurkin branch of the Borjigin, Muqali's father and uncles pledged allegiance to Temujin (Genghis Khan's original name) when he defeated the Jurkin in 1197. Gü'ün U'a offered his son Muqali to Temujin as a personal slave (emčü bo'ol). Several servants of Genghis Khan would be later appointed to prominent positions in his army, such as Jelme, who was promised as a slave to Genghis as an infant, and later rose to the position of captain of a Mingghan. During his time spent as Genghis Khan's servant, he and Genghis Khan presumably became very close. This intimacy would result in him becoming one of Genghis' closest advisors.

During the coronation of Genghis Khan in 1206, the latter recalled Muqali's support, and he was rewarded with the command of the third tumen and control over the eastern mingghans. He played a prominent role in the following campaign against Jin, including in the 1211 Battle of Yehuling, the decisive battle in the first stage of the Mongol conquest of the Jurchen-led Jin dynasty in northern China.

After Genghis Khan decided to go to war with the Khwarazmian Empire, he left Muqali in control of Northern China as viceroy, and gave him the title of gui ong or kuo-wang, a title not given to any other in Genghis Khan's army, and the title of taishi, a Chinese title also used by the Mongols. Muqali also set up a Chinese-style court protocol and wore Chinese-style imperial robes. Despite Genghis Khan having taken most of the main Mongol forces away and being sent to the West, Muqali was able to subdue most of northern China with his small force of around 20,000 Mongols, although some historians give figures of between 40,000 and 70,000 men to account for his foreign auxiliaries.

In 1217, Muqali attacked modern-day Hebei Province, northern Shandong Province, and northern Shaanxi Province, controlled by the Jin dynasty. This was an important agricultural area, which Muqali had largely subdued by 1219. In 1220, Muqali turned his attention to the rest of Shandong Province, conquering part of it; four towns were captured, but the hard-pressed Jin forces managed to hold on elsewhere in the province. After suffering a number of devastating defeats by Muqali in the field, the Jin learned that they could only hope to resist him by holding their cities and outlasting Muqali's staying power.

=== Final campaign and death ===
Muqali's last campaign was in the 1220s. He crossed the Ordos in mid-1221, spending the rest of the year conquering major cities in northern and central Shaanxi. He crossed the Yellow River into Shaanxi, first conquering, in November 1221, the strategic Jiazhou. Then, in the following months, he conquered the major Jin strongholds in northern and western Shaanxi. Crossing again the Yellow river on ice from the operational area near the Luo River in the Spring of 1222, he recaptured many towns in Shanxi, including Xizhou and Daizhou. He then left Mönggü Buqa (Bukha) in charge in Shaanxi and Gansu, and moved with the main army to Yuzhou, from thence to Jizhou, conquering all the Jin strongholds in the valley of the Fen River. He then took the strategic Hezhong at the end of 1222, conquering the major cities along the river. However, the cities of Jingzhao and Fengxiang resisted. As he was consolidating his position on both sides of the Yellow River, he became seriously ill and died in the Spring on 1223, at 53 years of age. On his deathbed, Muqali declared with pride that he had never been defeated. By the time of Ogedei's ascension in 1229, however, the Mongol detachments in China had suffered numerous setbacks, which led to a mini-revival of Jin fortunes until Subutai and Tolui were dispatched with the main Mongol army in 1232.

== Appearance and family ==
He was described by Chao Hang as a very tall man with a dark complexion and wavy whiskers, who was "generous and fond of conviviality, and amusing episodes about him have been preserved in the Sung envoy's account".

His chief wife's name was Lai-am (Naiman/Buqalun). He had eight other wives, four Mongols and four Jurchen. After his death, Genghis Khan gave command to Muqali's son, Bo’ol, who had seven sons: Taš of Jalair, Süγunčaq, Ba’atul noyan, Bai Inal, Emegen, Ebügen, and Arkis. Tas (also called Čalawun) was Muqali's favorite grandson, and the title of gui ong passed to him. Like Muqali, Bo'ol also recommended or appointed Chinese officials to high posts; these officials continued Chinese cultural, bureaucratic or ritual practices, employed former Jin officials and provided traditional Confucian education. Although the gui ong title passed to his descendants, his autonomous command and civil authority in North China was broken up. Subsequently the gui ong and his family (Qurumchi and Nayan) became increasingly "civil" (as opposed to martial) or Confucianised in their behaviour and were sidelined during the reign of Mongke Khan; later the family joined the Confucianizing party of Kublai Khan.

== Legacy ==
He received many posthumous honours, since as early as the 1320s. After his death, descendants of Muqali served the Great Khan of the Mongols, especially those of the Toluid lineage: prominent among these were Dorjeban and Dorǰi. A few of his descendants, such as Antong and Baiǰu, later became prominent officials in the Confucian fashion of the Yuan dynasty founded by Genghis Khan's grandson, Kublai Khan. Members of Muqali's Jalair tribe, as retainers of the Toluid Hulagu, participated in the conquest of Persia, then called Mollai, and later founded the Jalayirid Dynasty which ruled from Baghdad after the collapse of the Hulaguid Ilkhanate. Another descendant, Naγaču, survived the collapse of the Yuan and maintained his power under the Ming dynasty.

Muqali is considered a superb leader, and one of the "very few men who could exert a real influence on Genghis Khan's decisions". In seven years of campaigning in northern China, he had reduced the Jin dynasty's territories to only Henan Province. A statue of Muqali, together with Bo'orchu, flanks the statue of Genghis Khan in Sükhbaatar Square in Ulaanbaatar.
