= Akbarpour =

Akbarpour (Persian: اکبرپور) is a surname. Notable people with the surname include:

- Ahmad Akbarpour (born 1970), Iranian writer;
- Alireza Akbarpour (born 1973), Iranian footballer and manager;
- Siavash Akbarpour (born 1985), Iranian footballer and coach.
