= Dasht-e Gur =

Dasht-e Gur (Persian: دشت گور), also rendered as Dasht-e Kuror Dasht-e Kowr, may refer to:

- Dasht-e Gur, Bushehr
- Dasht-e Gur, Fars
