= Beryu =

Beryu may refer to:

- Beryu, Iran
- Beryu, Kyrgyzstan
