= Lamerd International Airport =

Lamerd International Airport فرودگاه بین المللی لامرد
- IATA: LFM; ICAO: OISR

Summary
- Airport type: Public
- Owner: Government of Iran
- Operator: Iran Airports Company
- Serves: Lamerd, Fars
- Location: Lamerd, Iran
- Elevation AMSL: 1,337 ft / 408 m
- Coordinates: 27°22′21.88″N 053°11′19.66″E
- Website: Lamerd International Airport

Map
- Location of airport in Iran

Runways
Direction	Length		Surface
Direction	ft	m	Surface
11/29	10,020	3,150	Asphalt

Statistics (2017)
- Aircraft Movements: 481 ▼6%
- Passengers: 18,552 ▼1%
- Cargo: 231 tons ▼2%
- Source: Iran Airports Company

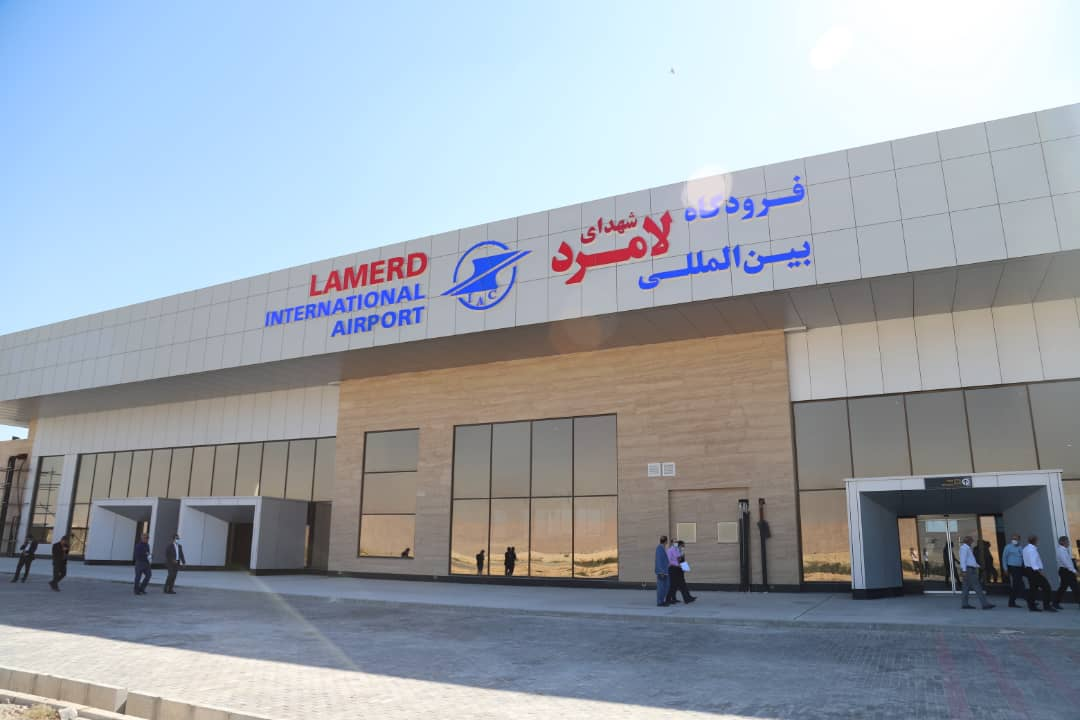
Lamerd International Airport – Terminal

Lamerd International Airport (IATA: LFM, ICAO: OISR) (Persian: فرودگاه بین المللی لامرد) is an international airport located in Lamerd, Iran. It is the international airport of Fars province and serves southern Iran.

== Airlines and destinations ==
Airlines	Destinations
Asa Jet	Tehran–Mehrabad
Caspian Airlines	Tehran–Mehrabad
Iran Air	Shiraz
Karun Airlines	Ahvaz, Bandar Abbas
Kish Air	Mashhad

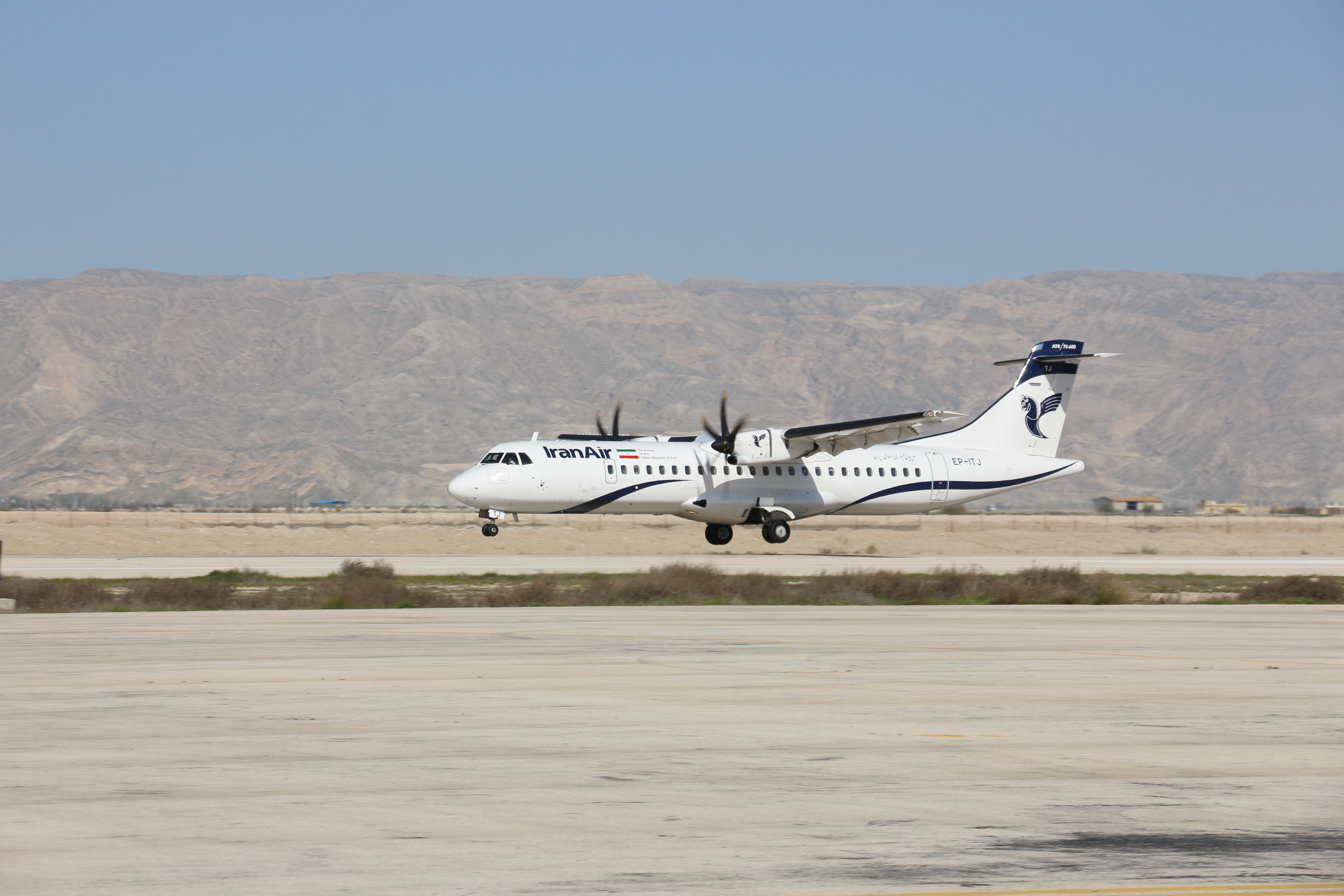
Iran Air ATR72 Landing on Lamerd International Airport
