= Eshkanan =

City in Fars province, Iran

Eshkanan Persian: اشکنان
- City
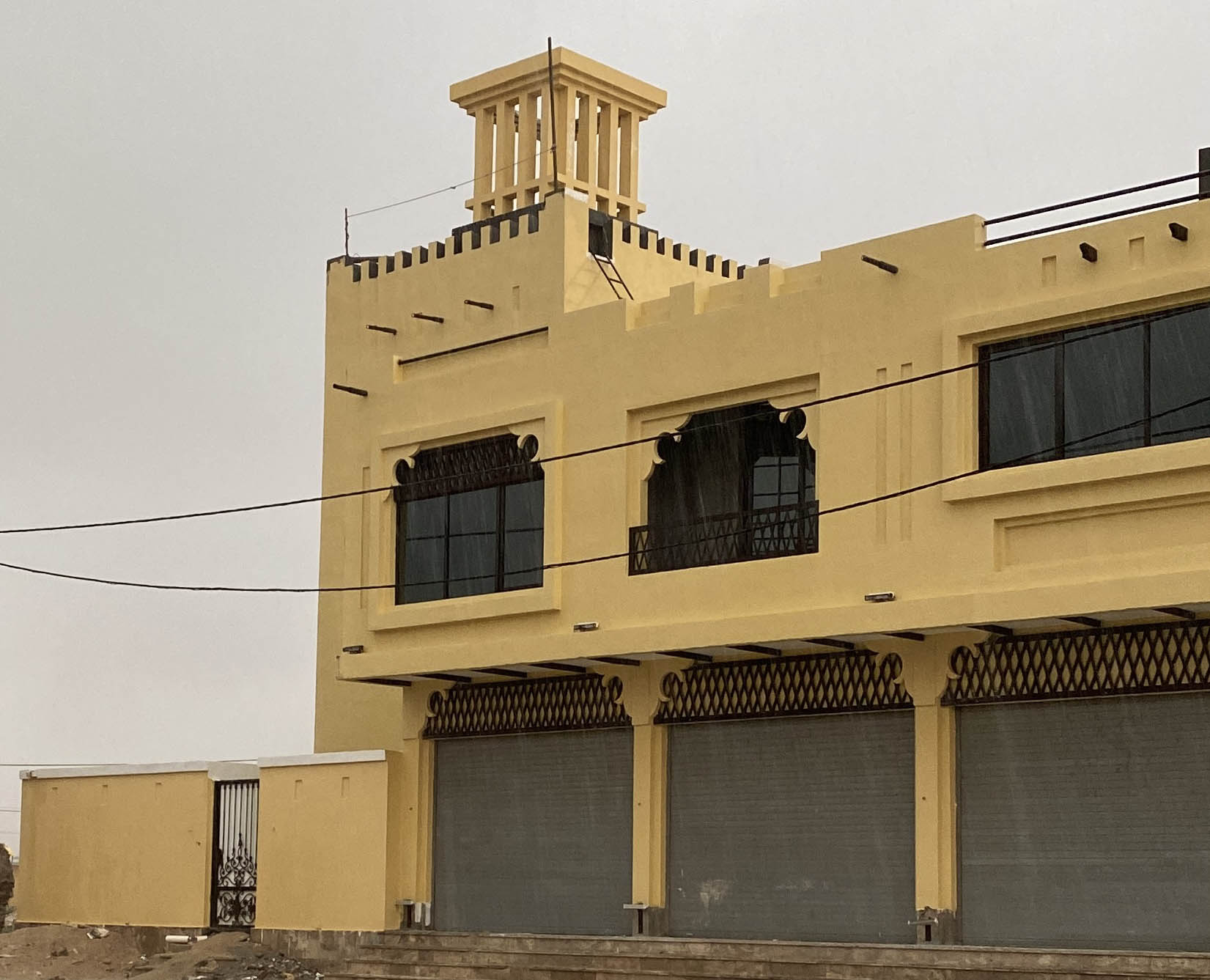

- Location within Iran
- Coordinates: 27°13′35″N 53°36′23″E
- Country: Iran
- Province: Fars
- County: Lamerd
- District: Eshkanan

Population (2016)
  - Total: 9,115
- Time zone: UTC+3:30 (IRST)

Eshkanan (Persian: اشکنان) (Note: Also romanized as Ashkanan, Eshkanān, and Īshkanān; also known as ‘Ishqanān; formerly Sodabgerd (سودابگرد)) is a city in, and the capital of, Eshkanan District of Lamerd County, Fars province, Iran. It also serves as the administrative center for Eshkanan Rural District.

== Demographics ==
=== Population ===
At the time of the 2006 National Census, the city's population was 7,513 in 1,516 households. The following census in 2011 counted 8,211 people in 1,946 households. The 2016 census measured the population of the city as 9,115 people in 2,406 households.
