= Ali Mohseni =

Ali Mohseni علي محسني
- Village
- Location within Iran
- Coordinates: 27°31′31″N 53°14′00″E
- Country: Iran
- Province: Fars
- County: Lamerd
- Bakhsh: Alamarvdasht
- Rural District: Kheyrgu

Population (2006)
  - Total: 33
- Time zone: UTC+3:30 (IRST)
  - Summer (DST): UTC+4:30 (IRDT)

Ali Mohseni (Persian: علي محسني, also Romanize as 'Alī Moḩsenī and 'Alīmoḩsenī) is a village in Kheyrgu Rural District, Alamarvdasht District, Lamerd County, Fars province, Iran. At the 2006 census, its population was 33, in 10 families.
