= 2026 Lamerd sports hall attack =

2026 Iran war missile strike

- Part of the 2026 Iran war
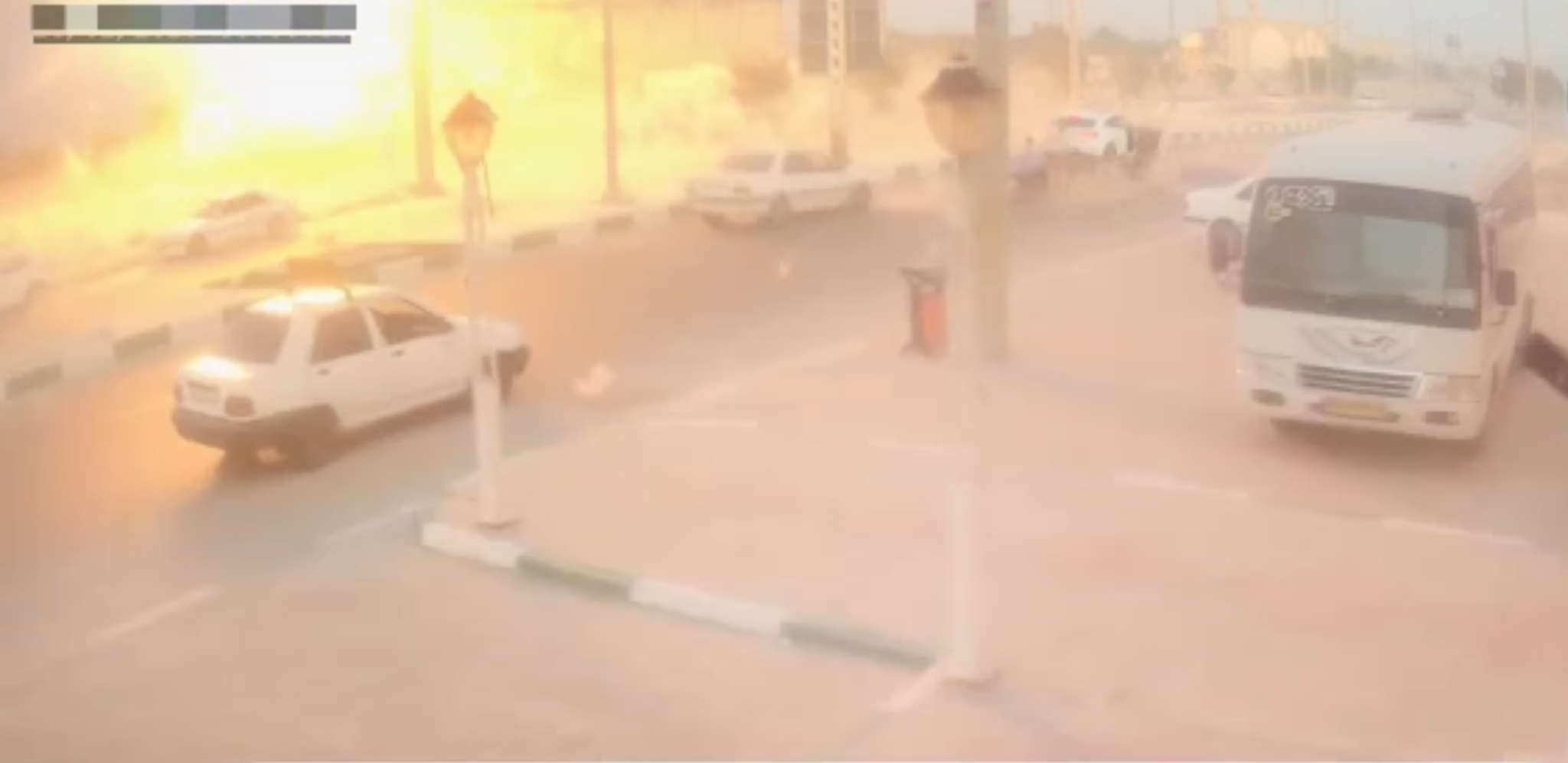
- CCTV still of a missile striking the sports hall

- Location within Iran
- Location: Lamerd, Fars province, Iran
- Date: 28 February 2026
- Attack type: Missile strike
- Weapon: Precision Strike Missile (PrSM)
- Deaths: 21
- Injuries: 100
- Perpetrator: United States (see Investigation)

On 28 February 2026, a sports hall in Lamerd in southern Iran was struck by the United States Armed Forces with a two‑missile strike while a women's volleyball team was using the facility, killing at least 21 people, including 4 children, and injuring 100 people. The attack took place shortly after the 2026 Minab school attack. While the United States Central Command (CENTCOM) denied responsibility and accused Iran, investigations by The New York Times, BBC Verify, and independent analysts concluded that a United States Precision Strike Missile was used in the attack.

== Attack ==
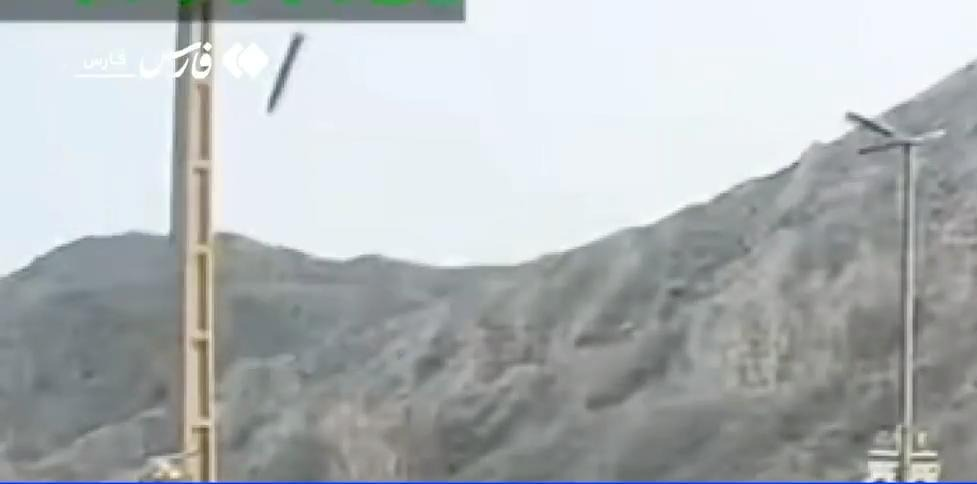
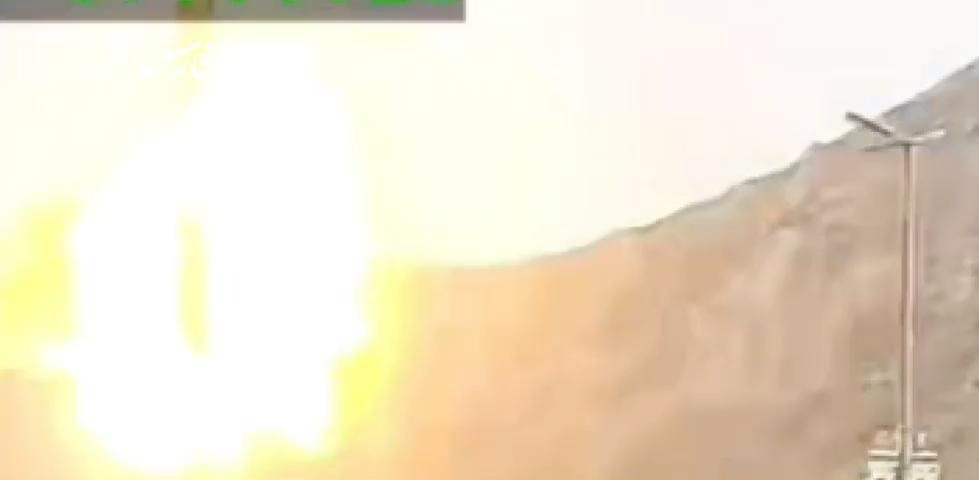
Video capturing the missile striking the sports hall

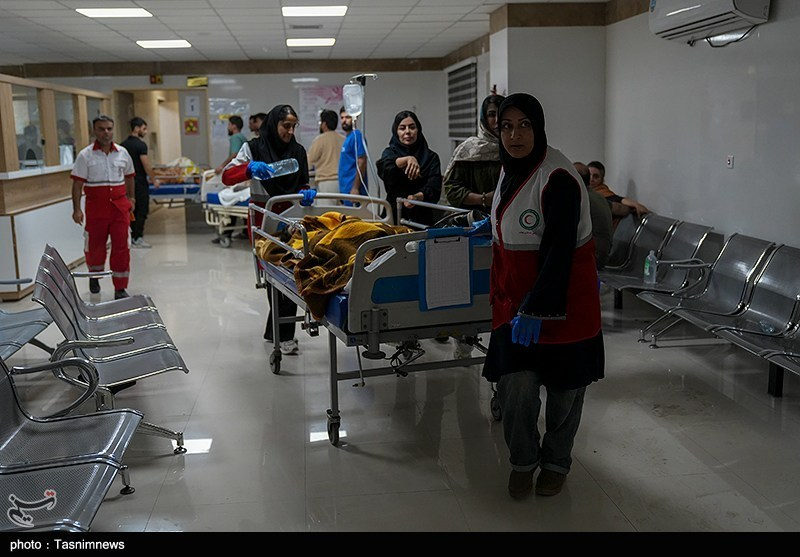
Casualties transported following the airstrikes

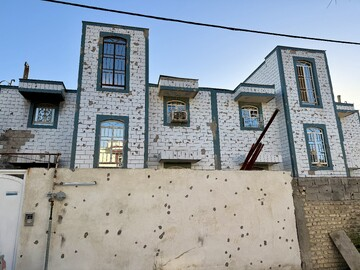
A footage, showing the impacts of United States PrSM missle pellets, penetrating building walls, and glass windows. In an attack on Lamerd, 2026

On 28 February 2026, two missiles struck a sports hall in Lamerd, taking place hours after the Minab school attack. At the time of the strikes, the sports hall was being used by a girls' volleyball team. The premises have been publicly identified as a civilian-use facility. According to video footage, the shockwaves of the missile appeared to shatter the building's windows and cause the entire side of the sports hall to blacken with soot, as well as causing damage to the roof. The attack killed 21 people, including 4 children, the youngest of them being two years old. An additional 100 people were injured. Additional strikes hit two nearby residential areas and another hall adjacent to a school.

A witness whose daughter was killed in the strike said,

The continuous screaming of the injured mixed with the sounds of secondary explosions. The ground was covered in debris and shattered glass. It was difficult to move with all the rubble. Ambulances arrived after about twenty minutes, but most of the injured were in critical condition. The smell of blood and burns covered everything…the survivors were injured with fractures and burns from the shrapnel.

CENTCOM spokesperson Tim Hawkins denied U.S. responsibility for the attack, insisting that the U.S. did not conduct any strikes in the area at the time and that the munition depicted in the video seems to be two times longer than a Precision Strike Missile and therefore consistent with an Iranian Hoveyzeh cruise missile. This statement was challenged by numerous weapons specialists, who said that the Hoveyzeh missile possesses several unique characteristics which are not apparent in the Lamerd strike video. Hawkins also emphasized that "US forces do not indiscriminately target civilians, unlike the Iranian regime". Israel also denied conducting strikes on Lamerd on 28 February.

== Investigation ==
According to BBC Verify, experts identified the munition before it exploded as likely being a U.S. missile according on its visual characteristics, the size of the explosion, and the distance from U.S. launch sites across the Middle East. A munitions expert from McKenzie Intelligence noted that the missile had no wings or external engine, but possessed distinctive "canard fins" consistent with a U.S. Precision Strike Missile (PrSM). Experts have also pointed to the mid-air explosion above Lamerd, indicating the airburst warhead feature of a Precision Strike Missile, which the Hoveyzeh missile is not known to have. Also Norwegian military expert, Lars Peder Haga, categorically rejected that claim by US, stating that the US claim that it was a Hoveyzeh missile was 'unprofessional and shameful' especially in the time that evidences are easily accessible.

According to The New York Times, the eruption of the missile mid-air is consistent with the Precision Strike Missile's design to detonate above its target and scatter tungsten pellets. It also noted that a U.S. official who spoke with NYT confirmed the missile used in the attack was the Precision Strike Missile. The Times said that the missile was being tested by the U.S. in combat for the first time, and therefore it is difficult to assess whether the strike was intentional.

On 17 September, the UN fact-finding mission said it had reasonable grounds to believe that U.S. forces were responsible for the attack on this sports hall and that it constituted a war crime.

== Reactions ==
- US Secretary of Defense Pete Hegseth said the US never target civilian targets.
- CENTCOM refused to carry out any operation in the city of Lamerd. CENTCOM spokesperson mentioned that "several media outlets recently reported accusations of US forces striking a sports hall and residential area in the city of Lamerd, Iran, on Feb. 28. After looking into the reports, US Central Command has confirmed the accusations are false". He also rejected claims that a Precision Strike Missile (PrSM) was used, saying footage circulating in media reports does not correspond to the system’s specifications. "US forces did not launch any strikes at any time into the city of Lamerd or anywhere within 30 miles (48 kilometers) during the opening day of Operation Epic Fury"
- The spokesperson of the Iranian Ministry of Foreign Affairs, Esmail Baghaei, stated on X that the attack is "not an isolated act of cruelty", but a part of a "systematic and brutal pattern of illegal warfare against Iran". Baghaei also called the attack as a "despicable war crime."

== See also ==
- US war crimes in Iran strikes
- 2026 Minab school attack
- United States war crimes
- Hamid Amini
- 2026 Sirik wedding airstrike
