= Sharafabad, Fars =

Sharafabad شرف اباد
- Village
- Location within Iran
- Coordinates: 27°31′36″N 53°13′44″E
- Country: Iran
- Province: Fars
- County: Lamerd
- Bakhsh: Alamarvdasht
- Rural District: Kheyrgu

Population (2006)
  - Total: 124
- Time zone: UTC+3:30 (IRST)
  - Summer (DST): UTC+4:30 (IRDT)

Sharafabad (Persian: شرف اباد, also Romanized as Sharafābād; also known as Deh Kohneh-ye Mollā’ī) is a village in Kheyrgu Rural District, Alamarvdasht District, Lamerd County, Fars province, Iran. At the 2006 census, its population was 124, in 31 families.
