= Dorjeban =

Yuan dynasty politician

Modern depiction of Dorjeban

Dorjeban (Chinese: 朵爾直班), courtesy name Weizhong (惟中), was an ethnic Mongol politician of the Yuan dynasty of China. He was a descendant of Genghis Khan's general Muqali and a member of the ruling house of Jalairs.

Dorjeban had a high level knowledge of Classical Chinese language and was a devoted Confucian scholar. He was appointed the Investigating censor in 1333. In 1341, he became a scholar of Hanlin Academy. Later he served as the governor of Liaoyang Province.

In the 1350s, farmers of Henan province started rioting against the dynasty because of years of famine. The imperial court interpreted the riot as a racial conflict instead of an economic one. Some Mongols suggested a genocide of Chinese civilians. Dorjeban strongly opposed this suggestion.

Dorjeban's sympathy towards rioters angered prime minister Toqto'a. He was then relocated to Shanxi province as an investigating censor. He built roads to facilitate traffic and recruited volunteers to fight for the dynasty. He died during his term in Huguang province as a governor, aged 40.
