= Deh Kohneh-ye Kamaraj =

Deh Kohneh-ye Kamarej ده كهنه كمارج
- Village
- Location within Iran
- Coordinates: 29°38′06″N 51°28′34″E
- Country: Iran
- Province: Fars
- County: Kazerun
- Bakhsh: Kamarej and Konartakhteh
- Rural District: Kamaraj

Population (2006)
  - Total: 524
- Time zone: UTC+3:30 (IRST)
  - Summer (DST): UTC+4:30 (IRDT)

Deh Kohneh-ye Kamarej (Persian: ده كهنه كمارج, also Romanized as Deh Kohneh-ye Kamarej; also known as Deh Kohneh) is a village in Kamarej Rural District, Kamarej and Konartakhteh District, Kazerun County, Fars province, Iran. At the 2006 census, its population was 524, in 104 families.
