= Deh-e Kohneh, Khuzestan =

Deh-e Kohneh ده كهنه
- Village
- Location within Iran
- Coordinates: 32°02′02″N 49°51′22″E
- Country: Iran
- Province: Khuzestan
- County: Izeh
- Bakhsh: Susan
- Rural District: Susan-e Gharbi

Population (2006)
  - Total: 133
- Time zone: UTC+3:30 (IRST)
  - Summer (DST): UTC+4:30 (IRDT)

Deh-e Kohneh (Persian: ده كهنه) is a village in Susan-e Gharbi Rural District, Susan District, Izeh County, Khuzestan Province, Iran. At the 2006 census, its population was 133, in 21 families.
