= Ahel, Fars =

City in Fars province, Iran

Ahel Persian: اهل
- City
- Location within Iran
- Coordinates: 27°12′41″N 53°39′31″E
- Country: Iran
- Province: Fars
- County: Lamerd
- District: Eshkanan

Population (2016)
  - Total: 3,179
- Time zone: UTC+3:30 (IRST)

Ahel (Persian: اهل) (Note: Also romanized as Ahl and Ehel) is a city in Eshkanan District of Lamerd County, Fars province, Iran.

== Demographics ==
=== Population ===
At the time of the 2006 National Census, the city's population was 2,797 in 606 households. The following census in 2011 counted 2,940 people in 752 households. The 2016 census measured the population of the city as 3,179 people in 839 households.
