= Achalaite =

General
- Category: Minerals
- Formula: (Fe^{2+},Mn)(Ti,Fe^{3+},Ta)(Nb,Ta)_{2}O_{8}
- IMA symbol: Ahl
- Strunz classification: 4.D0.
- Crystal system: Monoclinic
- Unit cell: a = 9.422(4) [Å], b = 11.427(3) [Å] c = 5.120(1) [Å]; β = 90.12°; Z = 4

Identification
- Color: Black
- Crystal habit: fibrous
- Mohs scale hardness: 5.5
- Luster: metallic
- Streak: black
- Specific gravity: 6.285
- Density: 6.285 g/cm^{3}
- Pleochroism: Non-pleochroic

Achalaite ((Fe^{2+}, Mn)(Ti, Fe^{3+}, Ta)(Nb, Ta)_{2}O_{8}) is a black mineral of the wodginite group, first discovered in 2013.

It crystallizes in the monoclinic system and has a dark, metallic luster, a specific gravity of 6.285 and a Mohs hardness of 5.5.

Achalaite occurs in the intermediate zone of topaz- and tantalite-bearing pegmatite. Associated minerals include rutile, quartz and albite.

Its name comes from the type locality: the Achala batholith in Córdoba, Argentina and the mineral has been approved by the IMA with the acronym 2013-103.
