= Deh Kohneh, Sepidan =

Deh Kohneh ده كهنه
- Village
- Location within Iran
- Coordinates: 30°21′46″N 51°48′16″E
- Country: Iran
- Province: Fars
- County: Sepidan
- Bakhsh: Central
- Rural District: Khafri

Population (2006)
  - Total: 115
- Time zone: UTC+3:30 (IRST)
  - Summer (DST): UTC+4:30 (IRDT)

Deh Kohneh (Persian: ده كهنه) is a village in Khafri Rural District, in the Central District of Sepidan County, Fars province, Iran. At the 2006 census, its population was 115, in 31 families.
