= Chah Varz =

City in Fars province, Iran

Chah Varz Persian: چاه ورز
- City
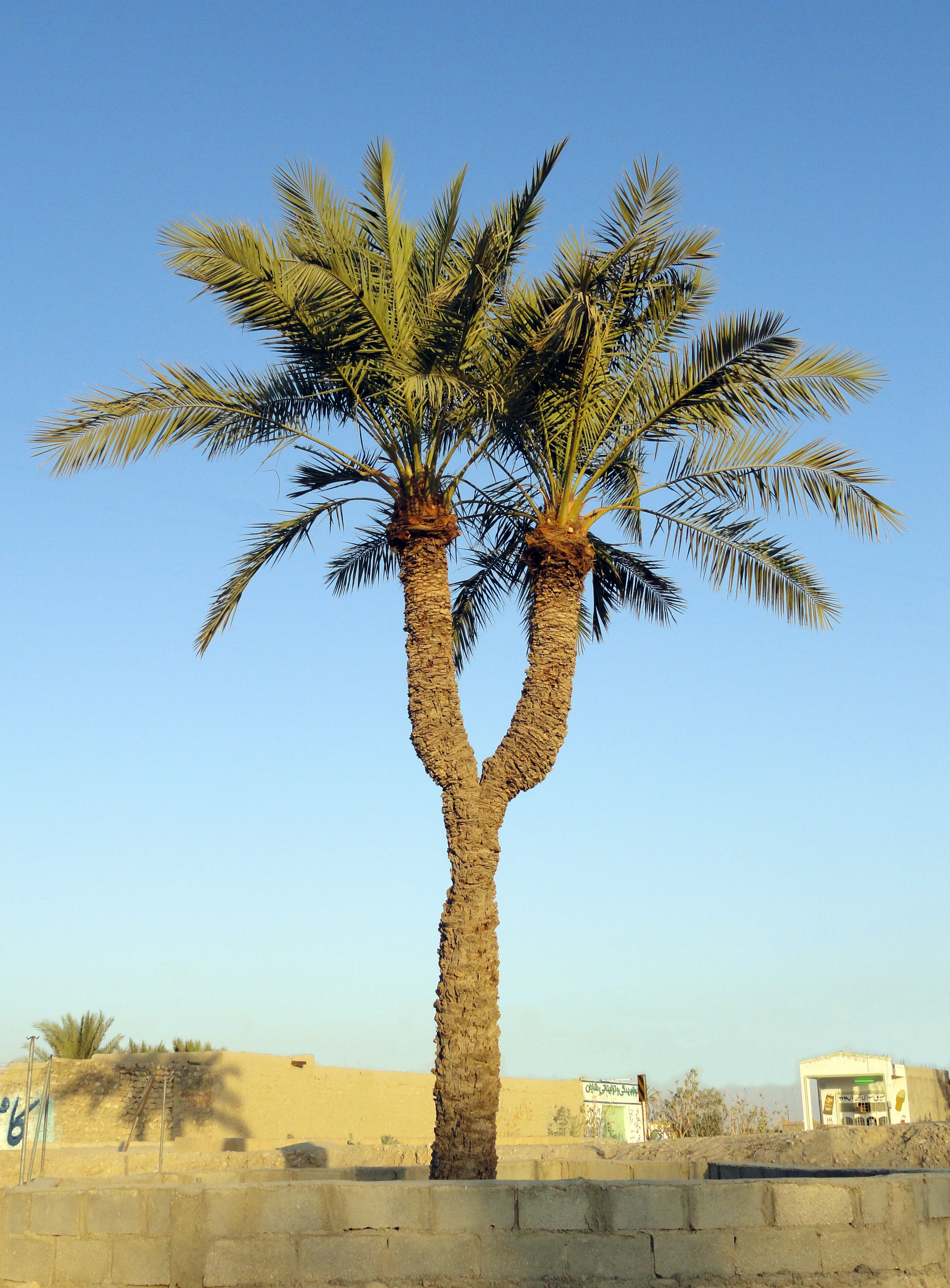
- A twin palm tree in Chahvarz

- Location within Iran
- Coordinates: 27°25′52″N 53°26′13″E
- Country: Iran
- Province: Fars
- County: Lamerd
- District: Chah Varz

Population (2016)
  - Total: 2,391
- Time zone: UTC+3:30 (IRST)

Chah Varz (Persian: چاه ورز) (Note: Also romanized as Chāh Varz; also known as Chāh Vard) is a city in, and the capital of, Chah Varz District of Lamerd County, Fars province, Iran. It also serves as the administrative center for Chah Varz Rural District.

== Etymology ==
Chah Varz's name is different in historical books, as "Chah Vard" or "Chah Bord". Ali-Akbar Dehkhoda wrote Chah Varz's name in the Dehkhoda Dictionary as "Chah Varzd," "Chah" meaning "water well" and "Vard" meaning Flower, translating to "Well of Flower."

Old Arabic authors wrote Chah Varz's name as "Chah Bord", meaning "Well of Rock" in English.

Old Chah Varzian people say the name was "Chah Varzā," which translates to "Well of Ox," saying the reason for this refers to the people of the town bringing oxen to retrieve water from the well.

== Demographics ==
=== Population ===
At the time of the 2006 National Census, Chah Varz's population was 2,640 in 521 households, when it was a village in Chah Varz Rural District of the Central District. The following census in 2011 counted 2,404 people in 619 households. The 2016 census measured the population of the village as 2,391 people in 737 households, by which time the rural district had been separated from the district in the formation of Chah Varz District. It was the most populous village in its rural district.

After the census, Chah Varz was elevated to the status of a city.

== Overview ==
Chah Varz is about 300 km south of the provincial capital city of Shiraz. It has a tropical climate and contains historical places. It is located near one of the biggest natural gas sites (Azadegan).
