= Deh Kohneh, Dalahu =

Deh Kohneh ده كهنه
- Village
- Location within Iran
- Coordinates: 34°26′50″N 46°10′40″E
- Country: Iran
- Province: Kermanshah
- County: Dalahu
- Bakhsh: Central
- Rural District: Bivanij

Population (2006)
  - Total: 135
- Time zone: UTC+3:30 (IRST)
  - Summer (DST): UTC+4:30 (IRDT)

Deh Kohneh (Persian: ده كهنه, also Romanized as Deh-e Kohneh) is a village in Bivanij Rural District, in the Central District of Dalahu County, Kermanshah Province, Iran. At the 2006 census, its population was 135, in 27 families.
