= Mian Kharreh-ye Bala =

Mian Kharreh-ye Bala ميان خره بالا
- Village
- Location within Iran
- Coordinates: 28°33′27″N 51°15′15″E
- Country: Iran
- Province: Bushehr
- County: Dashti
- Bakhsh: Central
- Rural District: Khvormuj

Population (2006)
  - Total: 200
- Time zone: UTC+3:30 (IRST)
  - Summer (DST): UTC+4:30 (IRDT)

Mian Kharreh-ye Bala (Persian: ميان خره بالا, also Romanized as Mīān Kharreh-ye Bālā; also known as Meyān Kharreh, Mīān Kherreh, Mīān Khowreh, Miyan Khazeh, and Miyān Khurrah) is a village in Khvormuj Rural District, in the Central District of Dashti County, Bushehr Province, Iran. At the 2006 census, its population was 200, in 50 families.
