= Deh Kohneh-ye Zafari =

Deh Kohneh-ye Zafari ده كهنه ظفري
- Village
- Location within Iran
- Coordinates: 30°25′39″N 51°08′37″E
- Country: Iran
- Province: Kohgiluyeh and Boyer-Ahmad
- County: Basht
- Bakhsh: Central
- Rural District: Kuh Mareh Khami

Population (2006)
  - Total: 50
- Time zone: UTC+3:30 (IRST)
  - Summer (DST): UTC+4:30 (IRDT)

Deh Kohneh-ye Zafari (Persian: ده كهنه ظفري, also Romanized as Deh Kohneh-ye Z̧afarī and Deh Kohneh-ye Ẕafarī) is a village in Kuh Mareh Khami Rural District, in the Central District of Basht County, Kohgiluyeh and Boyer-Ahmad Province, Iran. At the 2006 census, its population was 50, in 10 families.
