= Qaed-e Ebrahimi =

Qaed-e Ebrahimi قايدابراهيمي
- Village
- Location within Iran
- Coordinates: 29°03′00″N 51°19′09″E
- Country: Iran
- Province: Bushehr
- County: Tangestan
- Bakhsh: Central
- Rural District: Baghak

Population (2006)
  - Total: 38
- Time zone: UTC+3:30 (IRST)
  - Summer (DST): UTC+4:30 (IRDT)

Qaed-e Ebrahimi (Persian: قايدابراهيمي, also Romanized as Qāed-e Ebrāhīmī; also known as Qāedī) is a village in Baghak Rural District, in the Central District of Tangestan County, Bushehr Province, Iran. At the 2006 census, its population was 38, in 9 families.
