= Deh Kohneh, Lordegan =

Deh Kohneh ده كهنه
- Village
- Location within Iran
- Coordinates: 31°11′48″N 51°07′18″E
- Country: Iran
- Province: Chaharmahal and Bakhtiari
- County: Lordegan
- Bakhsh: Falard
- Rural District: Poshtkuh

Population (2006)
  - Total: 424
- Time zone: UTC+3:30 (IRST)
  - Summer (DST): UTC+4:30 (IRDT)

Deh Kohneh (Persian: ده كهنه) is a village in Poshtkuh Rural District, Falard District, Lordegan County, Chaharmahal and Bakhtiari Province, Iran. At the 2006 census, its population was 424, in 84 families. The village is populated by Lurs.
