= Deh-e Kohneh, Kiar =

Deh-e Kohneh ده كهنه
- Village
- Location within Iran
- Coordinates: 31°42′50″N 50°49′54″E
- Country: Iran
- Province: Chaharmahal and Bakhtiari
- County: Kiar
- Bakhsh: Naghan
- Rural District: Mashayekh

Population (2006)
  - Total: 86
- Time zone: UTC+3:30 (IRST)
  - Summer (DST): UTC+4:30 (IRDT)

Deh-e Kohneh (Persian: ده كهنه) is a village in Mashayekh Rural District, Naghan District, Kiar County, Chaharmahal and Bakhtiari Province, Iran. At the 2006 census, its population was 86, in 20 families.
