= Khalifeh Ha, Kermanshah =

Khalifeh Ha خليفه ها
- Village
- Location within Iran
- Coordinates: 34°27′04″N 46°21′29″E
- Country: Iran
- Province: Kermanshah
- County: Dalahu
- Bakhsh: Gahvareh
- Rural District: Gurani

Population (2006)
  - Total: 74
- Time zone: UTC+3:30 (IRST)
  - Summer (DST): UTC+4:30 (IRDT)

Khalifeh Ha (Persian: خليفه ها, also Romanized as Khalīfeh Hā) is a village in Gurani Rural District, Gahvareh District, Dalahu County, Kermanshah Province, Iran. At the 2006 census, its population was 74, in 17 families.
