= Dehkohneh-ye Hamidabad =

Dehkohneh-ye Hamidabad ده كهنه حميد اباد
- Village
- Location within Iran
- Coordinates: 30°57′43″N 51°15′15″E
- Country: Iran
- Province: Kohgiluyeh and Boyer-Ahmad
- County: Dana
- Bakhsh: Pataveh
- Rural District: Pataveh

Population (2006)
  - Total: 490
- Time zone: UTC+3:30 (IRST)
  - Summer (DST): UTC+4:30 (IRDT)

Dehkohneh-ye Hamidabad (Persian: ده كهنه حميد اباد, also Romanized as Dehkohneh-ye Ḩāmīdābād) is a village in Pataveh Rural District, Pataveh District, Dana County, Kohgiluyeh and Boyer-Ahmad Province, Iran. At the 2006 census, its population was 490, in 100 families.
