= Deh Kohneh-e Dowbalutan =

Deh Kohneh-e Dowbalutan ده كهنه دوبلوطان
- Village
- Country: Iran
- Province: Khuzestan
- County: Masjed Soleyman
- Bakhsh: Golgir
- Rural District: Tolbozan

Population (2006)
  - Total: 20
- Time zone: UTC+3:30 (IRST)
  - Summer (DST): UTC+4:30 (IRDT)

Deh Kohneh-e Dowbalutan (Persian: ده كهنه دوبلوطان, also Romanized as Deh Kohneh-e Dowbalūṭān) is a village in Tolbozan Rural District, Golgir District, Masjed Soleyman County, Khuzestan Province, Iran. At the 2006 census, its population was 20, in 5 families.
