= Ahl (surname) =

Ahl is a surname. Notable people with the surname include:

- David H. Ahl (born 1939), American writer
- Ernst Ahl (1898–1945), German zoologist
- Frederick Ahl (1941–2025), American academic and classical scholar
- John Alexander Ahl (1813–1882), American railroad executive and politician
- Kennet Ahl, pseudonym of Swedish crime novelist duo Lasse Strömstedt and Christer Dahl
