= Qazian-e Olya =

Qazian-e Olya قاضيان عليا
- Village
- Location within Iran
- Coordinates: 30°28′50″N 53°07′50″E
- Country: Iran
- Province: Fars
- County: Khorrambid
- Bakhsh: Mashhad-e Morghab
- Rural District: Shahidabad

Population (2006)
  - Total: 37
- Time zone: UTC+3:30 (IRST)
  - Summer (DST): UTC+4:30 (IRDT)

Qazian-e Olya (Persian: قاضيان عليا, also Romanized as Qāẕīān-e 'Olyā; also known as Deh-e Kohneh, Ghāzīān-e Bālā, Kazyān, Qal‘eh-ye Kohneh, Qāzeyān, Qāẕīān, Qāẕīān-e Bālā, and Qāzīyān) is a village in Shahidabad Rural District, Mashhad-e Morghab District, Khorrambid County, Fars province, Iran. At the 2006 census, its population was 37, in 11 families.
