= Kherreh Siah =

Kherreh Siah خره سياه
- Village
- Location within Iran
- Coordinates: 33°29′23″N 48°35′18″E
- Country: Iran
- Province: Lorestan
- County: Khorramabad
- Bakhsh: Zagheh
- Rural District: Zagheh

Population (2006)
  - Total: 94
- Time zone: UTC+3:30 (IRST)
  - Summer (DST): UTC+4:30 (IRDT)

Kherreh Siah (Persian: خره سياه, also Romanized as Kherreh Sīāh, Kharreh Seyāh, and Kharreh Sīāh) is a village in Zagheh Rural District, Zagheh District, Khorramabad County, Lorestan Province, Iran. At the 2006 census, its population was 94, in 22 families.
