= Deh Kohneh, Marvdasht =

Deh Kohneh ده کهنه
- Village
- Location within Iran
- Coordinates: 30°18′54″N 52°17′07″E
- Country: Iran
- Province: Fars
- County: Marvdasht
- Bakhsh: Kamfiruz
- Rural District: Kamfiruz-e Shomali

Population (2006)
  - Total: 403
- Time zone: UTC+3:30 (IRST)
  - Summer (DST): UTC+4:30 (IRDT)

Deh Kohneh (Persian: ده کهنه, also Romanized as Dehkohneh) is a village in Kamfiruz-e Shomali Rural District, Kamfiruz District, Marvdasht County, Fars province, Iran. At the 2006 census, its population was 403, in 101 families.
