= Deh Kohneh-e Mazdak =

Deh Kohneh-e Mazdak ده كهنه مزدك
- Village
- Location within Iran
- Coordinates: 30°44′19″N 51°31′08″E
- Country: Iran
- Province: Kohgiluyeh and Boyer-Ahmad
- County: Boyer-Ahmad
- Bakhsh: Central
- Rural District: Sarrud-e Shomali

Population (2006)
  - Total: 838
- Time zone: UTC+3:30 (IRST)
  - Summer (DST): UTC+4:30 (IRDT)

Deh Kohneh-e Mazdak (Persian: ده كهنه مزدك) is a village in Sarrud-e Shomali Rural District, in the Central District of Boyer-Ahmad County, Kohgiluyeh and Boyer-Ahmad Province, Iran. At the 2006 census, its population was 838, in 202 families.
