= Hossein Martin Fazeli =

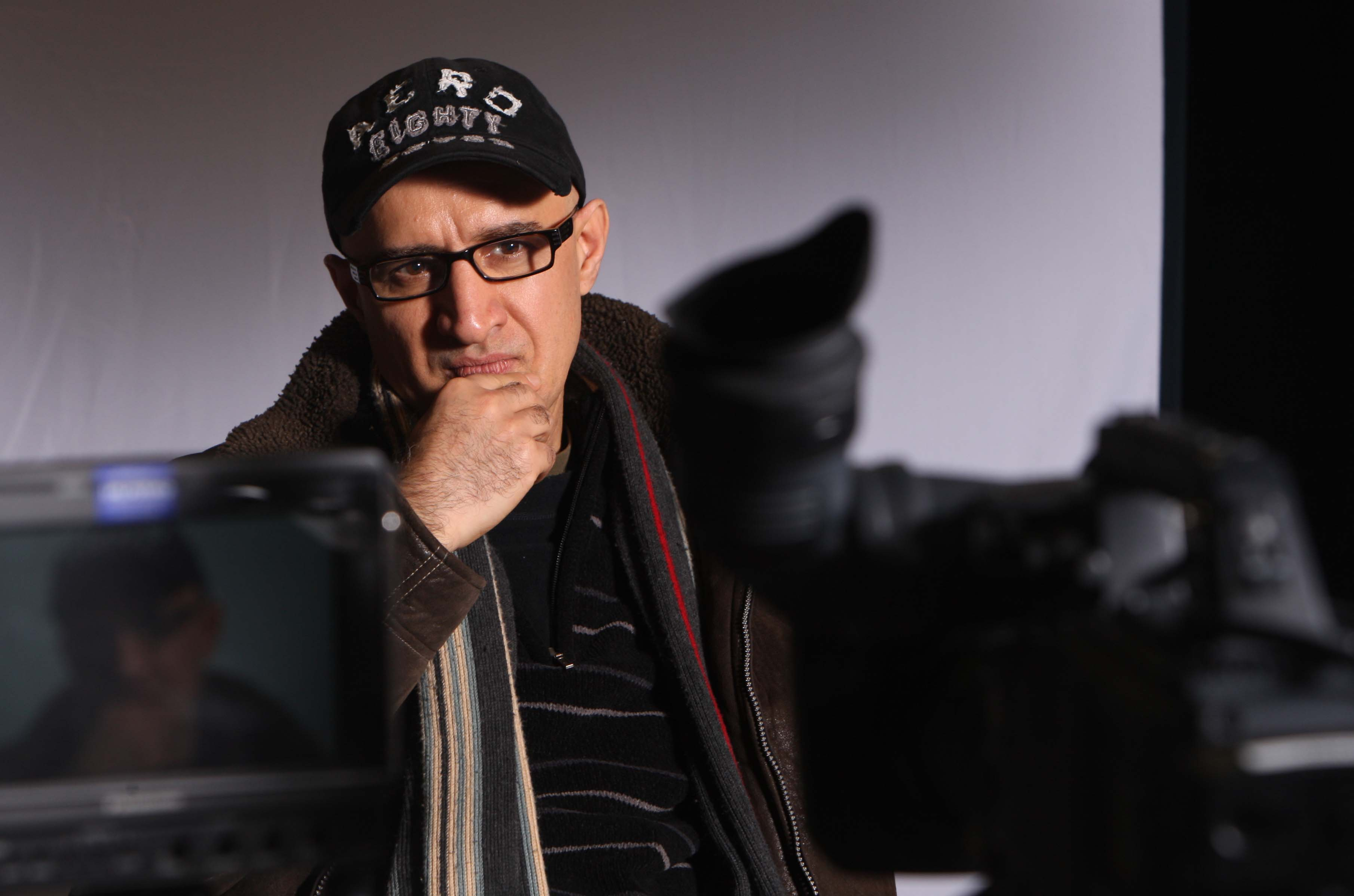
Hossein Martin Fazeli

Hossein Martin Fazeli is an Iranian-Canadian filmmaker, writer and educator whose work spans documentary, fiction and experimental cinema. He has directed and produced films in more than a dozen countries, with his work addressing subjects including human rights, displacement, gender and Indigenous issues.

His 2007 documentary The Tale of Two Nazanins examined the case of Nazanin Fatehi, an Iranian teenager sentenced to death. The film helped galvanize international attention to her case and contributed to the campaign that ultimately secured her release.

Fazeli's more recent work includes I Am Gitxsan, a feature documentary about the history and contemporary experiences of the Gitxsan people in British Columbia, and PHOOLAN, a feature documentary about Indian politician Phoolan Devi.

Fazeli has also published six books of Persian poetry under the pen name Naanaam.

== Career ==
Fazeli was born in Shiraz, Iran. In 1986 he left Iran for Dubai before emigrating to Canada to study film production at Concordia University and the Vancouver Film School. After completing his studies, he moved to Europe, where he wrote and directed a range of independent films.

Beyond filmmaking, Fazeli is also a poet. He has published six books of poetry in Persian under the pen name “Naanaam” («نانام»).

== Selected Filmography ==
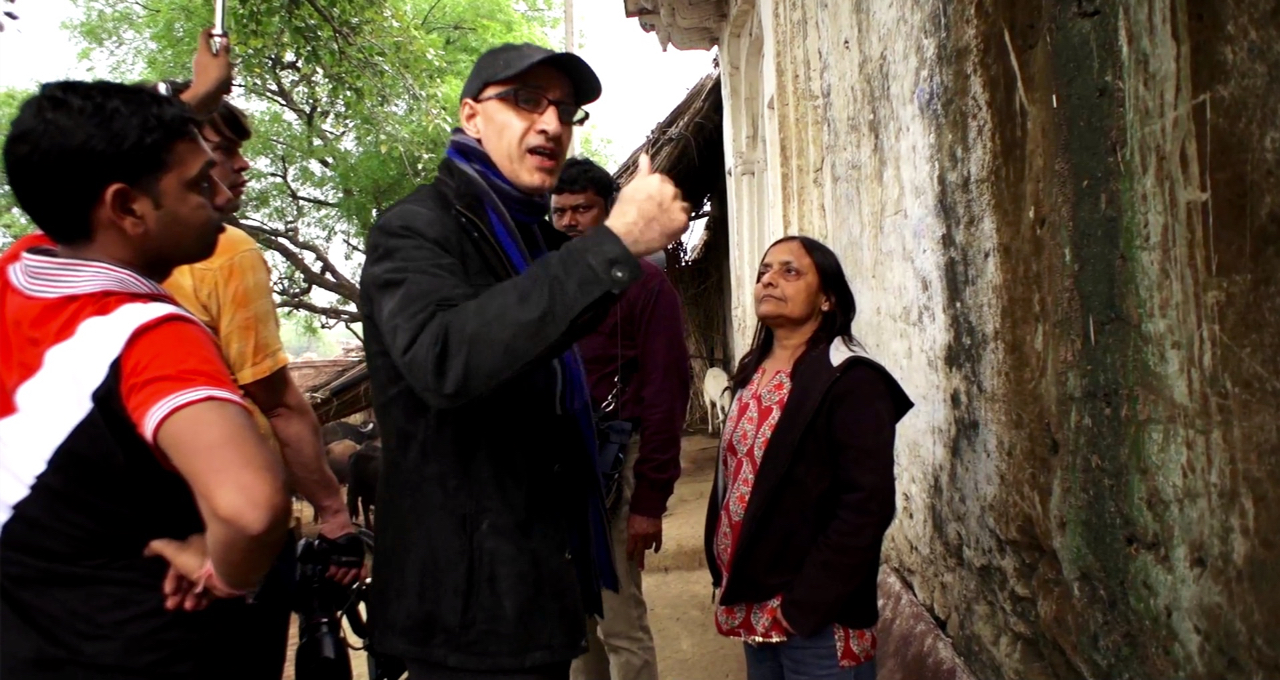
H.M.Fazeli on location in India for the filming of Phoolan

Film	Date	
I Am Gitxsan	2025	Feature-Length Documentary about the Gitxsan First Nation in Canada. https://iamgitxsan.com/
Phoolan	2026	Currently in Post-Production. Feature-Length Documentary about India's Bandit Queen. https://phoolandevimovie.com/
Our Country, Our Name	2026	Currently in Production. Feature-Length Documentary about the Canadian decedent, Yves Engler and his views on Canadian foreign policy. https://vimeo.com/443909303?fl=pl&fe=cm
Women on the Front Line	2015	Feature-Length Documentary about Iranian women's right activists who are on the forefront of one the largest nonviolent civil right movements in West Asia. https://vimeo.com/82733858?fl=pl&fe=cm
Legacy of Nonviolent Movements in Iran	2011	Documentary https://vimeo.com/27549444?share=copy&fl=cl&fe=ci
Inscribed	2008	Fiction
The Tale of Two Nazanins	2007	Documentary with dramatic reconstructions
The T-shirt	2006	Fiction
The Blind Man	2006	Media Campaign for the European Commission
The Journey	2006	Poem Film
A Foreign Poem	2004	Poem Film
Who is Sahraa?	2003	Documentary about Sahraa Karimi, Afghan Actress, Refugee, Rebel!
