= Nastaran Mohseni =

Iranian film director and cartoonist (born 1992)

- نسترن محسنی
- Born: January 22, 1992 (age 34); Bandar Abbas, Iran
- Occupations: Film director and Cartoonist
- Years active: 2013–present
- Spouse: Shahab Abroshan
- Website: NastaranMohseni.com

Nastaran Mohseni (Persian: نسترن محسنی) born 1992 in Bandar Abbas, Iran is an Iranian film director and Cartoonist. She started her work by studying film making processes in IYCS (Iranian Youth Cinema Society) and she directed her first short film named "Galed" in 2017. She continues her work as a cartoonist by publishing her work in local newspapers and social media.

== Biography ==
Mohseni graduated in Industrial engineering in 2014; and after that started her profession. She also works as an Illustrator and Graphic designer.

== Personal life ==
Nastaran Mohseni married Iranian Director Shahab Abroshan in 2015.

== Published ==
- The Cartoons of the year by Baban Publications (2016)
- Illustration of the local proverbs of Hormozgan (in Persian: Nooshkhandhaye Tamsil) (2019)

== Filmography ==
- Galed (2017)
- Epidemic (2019)

== Festivals ==
- 20th International Youth Visual Arts Festival (2013)
- Tehran International Short Film Festival (2017)
- Khorshid national Short Film Festival (2017)
- Gambron Screenwriting festival (2017)
- COLORS: Cinema+ Diversidade (Curitiba/ Brazil) (2017)

== Awards ==
She has received first fiction short screenplay awards from Gambron Screenwriting Festival for A Bullet in the fist in 2017.

== See also ==
- Iranian women
- List of famous Persian women
- List of female film directors
- Women's cinema
