= Chah Varz District =

District in Fars province, Iran

Chah Varz District Persian: بخش چاه‌ورز
- District
- Location within Iran
- Coordinates: 27°26′55″N 53°21′51″E
- Country: Iran
- Province: Fars
- County: Lamerd
- Capital: Chah Varz

Population (2016)
  - Total: 7,010
- Time zone: UTC+3:30 (IRST)

Chah Varz District (Persian: بخش چاه‌ورز) is in Lamerd County, Fars province, Iran. Its capital is the city of Chah Varz.

== History ==
In 2013, Chah Varz Rural District was separated from the Central District in the formation of Chah Varz District. After the 2016 National Census, the village of Chah Varz was elevated to the status of a city.

== Demographics ==
=== Population ===
At the time of the 2016 census, the district's population was 7,010 inhabitants in 2,011 households.

=== Administrative divisions ===
Chah Varz District Population
Administrative Divisions	2016
Chah Varz RD	4,181
Sheykh Amer RD	2,829
Chah Varz (city) (Note: Became a city after the 2016 census)	
Total	7,010
RD = Rural District
