= Kal Rural District =

Rural district in Fars province, Iran

Kal Rural District Persian: دهستان كال
- Rural District
- Location within Iran
- Coordinates: 27°12′23″N 53°46′44″E
- Country: Iran
- Province: Fars
- County: Lamerd
- District: Eshkanan
- Capital: Kal

Population (2016)
  - Total: 5,076
- Time zone: UTC+3:30 (IRST)

Kal Rural District (Persian: دهستان كال) is in Eshkanan District of Lamerd County, Fars province, Iran. Its capital is the village of Kal.

== Demographics ==
=== Population ===
At the time of the 2006 National Census, the rural district's population was 4,562 in 954 households. There were 4,724 inhabitants in 1,158 households at the following census of 2011. The 2016 census measured the population of the rural district as 5,076 in 1,359 households. The most populous of its 16 villages was Kal, with 1,801 people.
