= Lamerd =

City in Fars province, Iran

Lamerd لامرد
- City
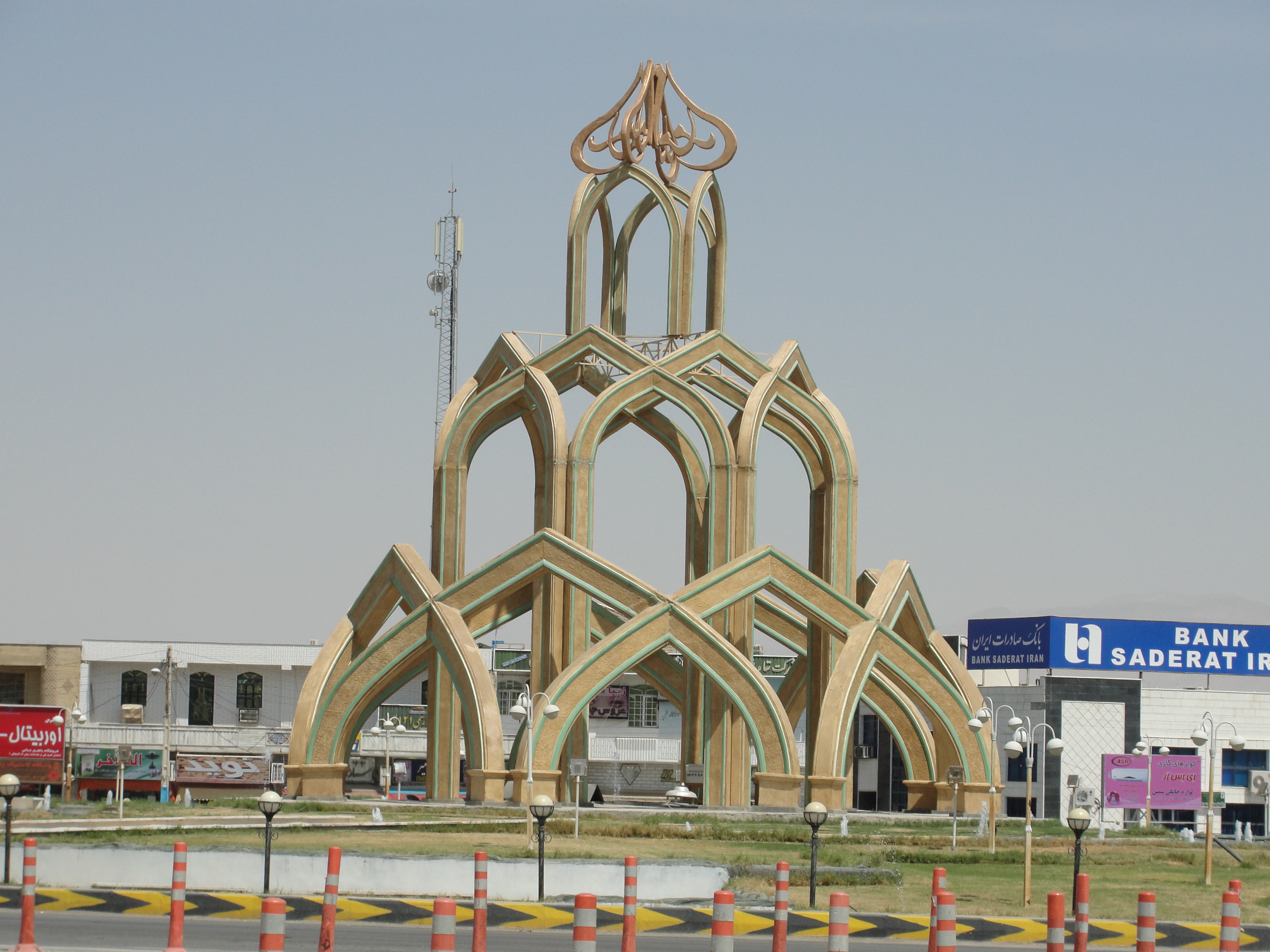

- Location within Iran
- Coordinates: 27°20′01″N 53°11′19″E
- Country: Iran
- Province: Fars
- County: Lamerd
- District: Central
- Elevation: 670 m (2,200 ft)

Population (2016)
  - Total: 29,380
- Time zone: UTC+3:30 (IRST)

Lamerd (Persian: لامرد) (Note: Also romanized as Lāmard and Lāmerd, also known as Tarakma) is a city in the Central District of Lamerd County, Fars province, Iran, serving as capital of both the county and the district.

== History ==
Before becoming a city, Lamerd was a small village in the Tarakmeh rural district of Kangan, Bushehr County. Administrative reforms later made it a district of Larestan County, and in 1989 it was officially upgraded to Lamerd County. Today, the county consists of three districts, seven rural districts, and around 140 villages.

Archaeological evidence indicates that Lamerd has a long and rich history. The Kenaru mound near Roknabad village dates back more than 5000 years, while several ancient mounds in Allamroudasht have yielded decorated buff-colored pottery. Remains from the Achaemenid period, including column capitals from former palaces or pavilions also have been discovered.

During the Parthian and Sasanian eras, Lamerd served as an important military center, with numerous forts and fire temples constructed throughout the region. Some of these religious sites still survive in Khafrouyeh, Allamroudasht, and Ashkanan. In the Islamic period, the Lamerd pass became a major route for migrating and traveling peoples, whose diverse influences helped shape the region’s rich cultural heritage.

== Demographics ==
=== Ethnicity ===
Lamerd was historically part of the region of Irahistan. The people of Lamerd are known as the Achomi people.

=== Population ===
At the time of the 2006 National Census, the city's population was 21,365 in 4,921 households. The following census in 2011 counted 25,131 people in 6,572 households. The 2016 census measured the population of the city as 29,380 people in 8,529 households.

== Climate ==
Lamerd has a hot desert climate (BWh) according to the Köppen climate classification.

Climate data for Lamerd (1995-2005)
Month	Jan	Feb	Mar	Apr	May	Jun	Jul	Aug	Sep	Oct	Nov	Dec	Year
Daily mean °C (°F)	14.0 (57.2)	16.2 (61.2)	19.5 (67.1)	25.4 (77.7)	31.0 (87.8)	33.9 (93.0)	35.5 (95.9)	34.8 (94.6)	31.4 (88.5)	26.7 (80.1)	20.2 (68.4)	16.1 (61.0)	25.4 (77.7)
Mean daily minimum °C (°F)	7.9 (46.2)	9.3 (48.7)	12.0 (53.6)	16.4 (61.5)	21.2 (70.2)	23.5 (74.3)	26.6 (79.9)	25.8 (78.4)	21.7 (71.1)	17.0 (62.6)	11.8 (53.2)	9.0 (48.2)	16.9 (62.3)
Average precipitation mm (inches)	80.8 (3.18)	24.1 (0.95)	54.3 (2.14)	7.1 (0.28)	0.0 (0.0)	1.6 (0.06)	2.0 (0.08)	7.5 (0.30)	0.4 (0.02)	2.2 (0.09)	7.8 (0.31)	49.3 (1.94)	237.1 (9.35)
Average relative humidity (%)	65	55	50	34	22	21	29	33	36	37	46	50	40
Source: IRIMO

== Industry ==
The city's main industries are based on its rich natural gas sources. Tabnak, Homa, Shanol, Varavi are important local gas zones.

== Transportation ==
Lamerd International Airport opened in 1964, with flights to Tehran, Shiraz, Lar, Lavan and international flights to Bahrain, Kuwait, United Arab Emirates, and Qatar.

== Popular culture ==
The name of the city Lamerd has been significantly circulated in the media outlet following the US attack to the city on the first day of the US-Israeli war on Iran in February 2026. In the first hours of the opening day of the war on 28 February 2026, a sports hall in the city was bombed with an alleged Precision Strike Missile, tested on field for the first time. The attack killed only civilians in a city not known for any special military apparatus. More than 20 people were and around 100 seriously injured due to the thousands of Tungsten fragments embedded in the PrSM bombs An additional 100 people were injured.. Investigative reports by The New York Times and weapons experts, including Jeffrey Lewis, identified the munition as a U.S.-made Precision Strike Missile (PrSM), citing visual evidence of fragmentation patterns and airburst detonation.
