= Chah Varz Rural District =

Rural district in Fars province, Iran

Chah Varz Rural District Persian: دهستان چاه‌ورز
- Rural District
- Location within Iran
- Coordinates: 27°26′16″N 53°23′08″E
- Country: Iran
- Province: Fars
- County: Lamerd
- District: Chah Varz
- Capital: Chah Varz

Population (2016)
  - Total: 4,181
- Time zone: UTC+3:30 (IRST)

Chah Varz Rural District (Persian: دهستان چاه‌ورز) is in Chah Varz District of Lamerd County, Fars province, Iran. It is administered from the city of Chah Varz. Chah Varz is about 350 km distance from Shiraz and 486 meters above sea level and in the Zagros Mountains is located south of aria and its weather is tropic and malarian

== Etymology ==
Chah Varz name is different in historical book: like "Chah Vard", "Chah Bord". Ali-Akbar Dehkhoda wrote chah varz name in Dehkhoda Dictionary "chah varzd" this name Include Chah and Vard; Chah mining in English "Water well" and "Vard" mining Flower So Chah Varz mining Well of Flower.

Old Arabic author wrote Chah Varz name to Chah Bord and Chah Bord mining to English Well of Rock.

Old Chah Varzian People say the name of Chah Varz was Chah Varzā this name mining to English "Well of Ox" old people say to reason of this etymology: was in Chah Varz Ox and people by this ox taking water out of well.

== History ==
Chah Varz rural district was created in 1993. Justification designs to create the district of the Chah Varz in 2004. In 2011 by Ruhollah Ahmadzadeh the Governor of Fars approved to the Ministry of the Interior in May 2011, the political Commission will send a defense to the Cabinet and the plan passed on 20 September 2012.

The name of Chah Varz in the Dehkhoda Dictionary is a village of the beyram Rural District and the job of Chah Varz citizens was agriculture and significant herd. but nowadays people's job is more commercial and services work. The commercial position of this sector and the existence of Lamerd County communication paths to the center in Fars province and Larestan is the importance of this point. In the mid-4th century Affifuddin Shah Zendo attack to Chah Varz and after the defeat of the old residents of the Sassanian this area was completely deserted this region until "Ali Mohub"

"Chahvarz Twin" Palm in the book of folklore and customs of Lamerd customs decodes the target tourism works in the city of Lamerd.

Before Islam Gabrs lived in Chah Varz village and their religion was Zoroastrianism .

== Demographics ==
=== Population ===
At the time of the 2006 National Census, the rural district's population (as a part of the Central District) was 7,985 in 1,565 households. There were 6,788 inhabitants in 1,716 households at the following census of 2011. The 2016 census measured the population of the rural district as 4,181 in 1,229 households, by which time the rural district had been separated from the district in the establishment of Chah Varz District. The most populous of its six villages was Chah Varz (now a city), with 2,391 people.
