= Eshkanan Rural District =

Rural district in Fars province, Iran

Eshkanan Rural District Persian: دهستان اشكنان
- Rural District
- Location within Iran
- Coordinates: 27°13′32″N 53°31′14″E
- Country: Iran
- Province: Fars
- County: Lamerd
- District: Eshkanan
- Capital: Eshkanan

Population (2016)
  - Total: 4,138
- Time zone: UTC+3:30 (IRST)

Eshkanan Rural District (Persian: دهستان اشكنان) is in Eshkanan District of Lamerd County, Fars province, Iran. It is administered from the city of Eshkanan.

== Demographics ==
=== Population ===
At the time of the 2006 National Census, the rural district's population was 3,813 in 829 households. There were 4,183 inhabitants in 1,011 households at the following census of 2011. The 2016 census measured the population of the rural district as 4,138 in 1,089 households. The most populous of its 22 villages was Lavar Khesht, with 1,163 people.
