= Sigar Rural District =

Rural district in Fars province, Iran

Sigar Rural District Persian: دهستان سيگار
- Rural District
- Location within Iran
- Coordinates: 27°18′09″N 53°17′13″E
- Country: Iran
- Province: Fars
- County: Lamerd
- District: Central
- Capital: Sigar-e Bala

Population (2016)
  - Total: 10,953
- Time zone: UTC+3:30 (IRST)

Sigar Rural District (Persian: دهستان سيگار) is in the Central District of Lamerd County, Fars province, Iran. Its capital is the village of Sigar-e Bala.

== Demographics ==
=== Population ===
At the time of the 2006 National Census, the rural district's population was 9,934 in 2,138 households. There were 10,828 inhabitants in 2,724 households at the following census of 2011. The 2016 census measured the population of the rural district as 10,953 in 2,999 households. The most populous of its 32 villages was Sigar-e Bala, with 1,467 people.
