= Eshkanan District =

District in Fars province, Iran

Eshkanan District Persian: بخش اشکنان
- District
- Location within Iran
- Coordinates: 27°12′21″N 53°39′47″E
- Country: Iran
- Province: Fars
- County: Lamerd
- Capital: Eshkanan

Population (2016)
  - Total: 21,508
- Time zone: UTC+3:30 (IRST)

Eshkanan District (Persian: بخش اشکنان) is in Lamerd County, Fars province, Iran. Its capital is the city of Eshkanan.

== Demographics ==
=== Population ===
At the time of the 2006 National Census, the district's population was 18,685 in 3,905 households. The following census in 2011 counted 20,058 people in 4,867 households. The 2016 census measured the population of the district as 21,508 inhabitants in 5,693 households.

=== Administrative divisions ===
Eshkanan District Population
Administrative Divisions	2006	2011	2016
Eshkanan RD	3,813	4,183	4,138
Kal RD	4,562	4,724	5,076
Ahel (city)	2,797	2,940	3,179
Eshkanan (city)	7,513	8,211	9,115
Total	18,685	20,058	21,508
RD = Rural District
