= Howmeh Rural District (Lamerd County) =

Rural district in Fars province, Iran

Howmeh Rural District Persian: دهستان حومه
- Rural District
- Location within Iran
- Coordinates: 27°22′58″N 53°10′53″E
- Country: Iran
- Province: Fars
- County: Lamerd
- District: Central
- Capital: Tarman

Population (2016)
  - Total: 3,733
- Time zone: UTC+3:30 (IRST)

Howmeh Rural District (Persian: دهستان حومه) is in the Central District of Lamerd County, Fars province, Iran. Its capital is the village of Tarman.

== Demographics ==
=== Population ===
At the time of the 2006 National Census, the rural district's population was 4,087 in 899 households. There were 4,186 inhabitants in 1,037 households at the following census of 2011. The 2016 census measured the population of the rural district as 3,733 in 1,047 households. The most populous of its 37 villages was Tarman, with 657 people.
