= Central District (Lamerd County) =

District in Fars province, Iran

Central District (Lamerd County) Persian: بخش مرکزی شهرستان لامرد
- District
- Location within Iran
- Coordinates: 27°20′37″N 53°13′40″E
- Country: Iran
- Province: Fars
- County: Lamerd
- Capital: Lamerd

Population (2016)
  - Total: 44,066
- Time zone: UTC+3:30 (IRST)

The Central District of Lamerd County (Persian: بخش مرکزی شهرستان لامرد) is in Fars province, Iran. Its capital is the city of Lamerd.

== History ==
After the 2011 census, Chah Varz Rural District was separated from the district in the formation of Chah Varz District.

== Demographics ==
=== Population ===
At the time of the 2006 National Census, the district's population was 43,371 in 9,523 households. In the 2011 census, the population increased to 46,933 people in 12,049 households. By the 2016 census, the population had declined slightly to 44,066 inhabitants in 12,575 households.

=== Administrative divisions ===
Central District (Lamerd County) Population
Administrative Divisions	2006	2011	2016
Chah Varz RD (Note: Transferred to Chah Varz District)	7,985	6,788	
Howmeh RD	4,087	4,186	3,733
Sigar RD	9,934	10,828	10,953
Lamerd (city)	21,365	25,131	29,380
Total	43,371	46,933	44,066
RD = Rural District
