= Lamerd County =

County in Fars province, Iran

Lamerd County Persian: شهرستان لامرد
- County
- Location of Lamerd County in Fars province (bottom, yellow)

- Location of Fars province in Iran
- Coordinates: 27°32′N 53°17′E
- Country: Iran
- Province: Fars
- Capital: Lamerd
- Districts: Central, Alamarvdasht, Chah Varz, Eshkanan, Kheyrgu

Population (2016)
  - Total: 91,782
- Time zone: UTC+3:30 (IRST)

Lamerd County (Persian: شهرستان لامرد) is in Fars province, Iran. Its capital is the city of Lamerd.

== History ==
After the 2011 census, Chah Varz Rural District was separated from the Central District in the formation of Chah Varz District, which was divided into two rural districts, including the new Sheykh Amer Rural District.

After the 2016 census, Kahnuyeh Rural District was established in Alamarvdasht District, and Kheyrgu Rural District was separated from it in the formation of Kheyrgu District, which was divided into two rural districts, including the new Kamali Rural District. The villages of Chah Varz and Kheyrgu were elevated to city status.

== Demographics ==
=== Ethnicity ===
Lamerd was historically part of the region of Irahistan. The people of Lamerd are known as the Achomi people.

=== Population ===
At the time of the 2006 census, the county's population was 76,971 in 16,602 households. The following census in 2011 counted 83,916 people in 21,210 households. The 2016 census measured the population of the county as 91,782 in 25,837 households.

=== Administrative divisions ===
Lamerd County's population history and administrative structure over three consecutive censuses are shown in the following table.

Lamerd County Population
Administrative Divisions	2006	2011	2016
Central District	43,371	46,933	44,066
Chah Varz RD	7,985	6,788	
Howmeh RD	4,087	4,186	3,733
Sigar RD	9,934	10,828	10,953
Lamerd (city)	21,365	25,131	29,380
Alamarvdasht District	14,915	16,902	19,190
Alamarvdasht RD	5,154	6,050	6,511
Kahnuyeh RD (Note: Established after the 2016 census)			
Kheyrgu RD	6,259	6,757	8,611
Alamarvdasht (city) (Note: Formerly the village of Chah Ayni)	3,502	4,095	4,068
Chah Varz District			7,010
Chah Varz RD			4,181
Sheykh Amer RD			2,829
Chah Varz (city) (Note: Became a city after the 2016 census)			
Eshkanan District	18,685	20,058	21,508
Eshkanan RD	3,813	4,183	4,138
Kal RD	4,562	4,724	5,076
Ahel (city)	2,797	2,940	3,179
Eshkanan (city)	7,513	8,211	9,115
Kheyrgu District			
Kamali RD			
Kheyrgu RD			
Kheyrgu (city) (Note: Became a city after the 2016 census)			
Total	76,971	83,916	91,782
RD = Rural District

== See also ==
Media related to Lamerd County at Wikimedia Commons
