= Mongol conquests =

Series of military campaigns by the Mongol Empire

Expansion of the Mongol Empire (1206–1294)

The Mongol conquests took place during the 13th and 14th centuries, creating the largest contiguous empire in history, the Mongol Empire (1206–1368), which by 1260 covered a significant portion of Eurasia. At its height, it stretched from the Pacific to Central Europe. As the Mongol Empire began to fragment from 1260, conflict between the Mongols and Eastern European polities continued for centuries. Mongols continued to rule China into the 14th century under the Yuan dynasty, while Mongol rule in Persia persisted into the 15th century under the Timurid Empire. In the Indian subcontinent, the later Mughal Empire survived into the 19th century.

== Background ==
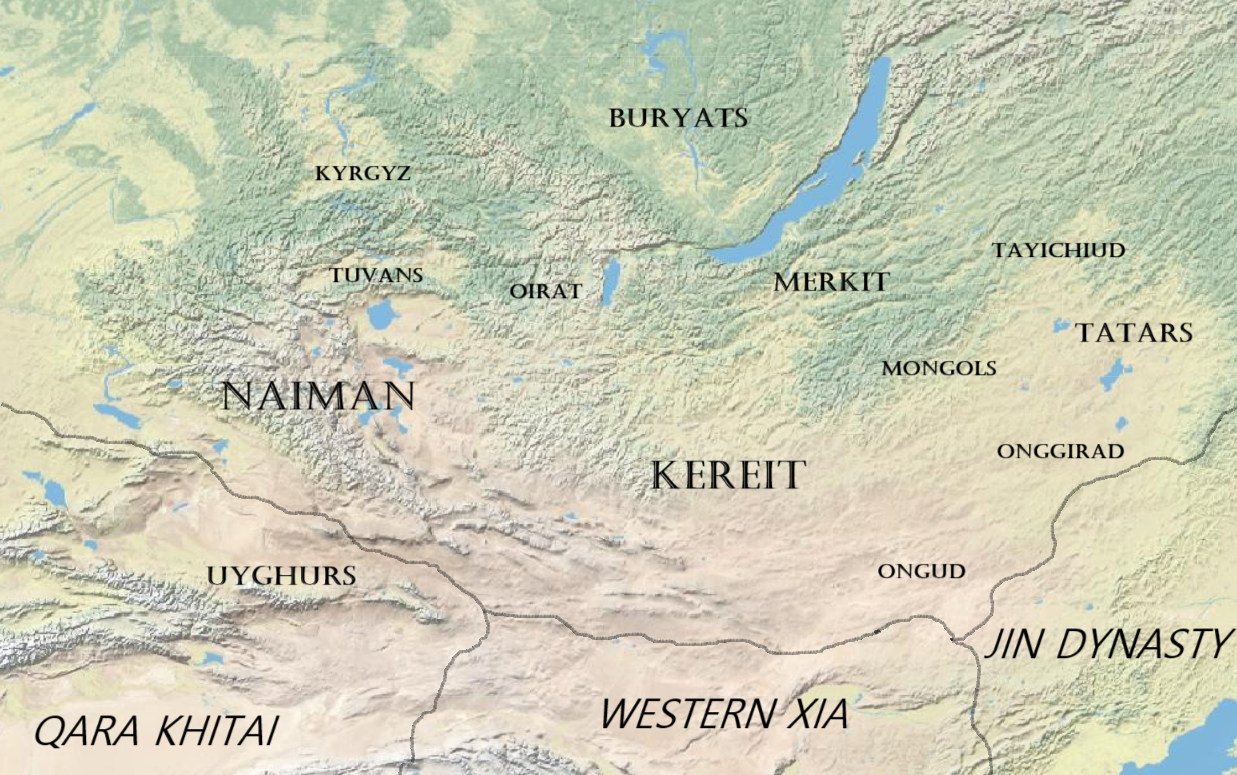
The major tribes of the Mongolian Plateau and nearby polities in the mid-12th century

The predecessors of the Mongol tribe were first recorded in the late tenth century, as they migrated from eastern Manchuria into the Mongolian Plateau, where they settled southeast of Lake Baikal near the mountain Burkhan Khaldun. During the twelfth century, the Mongols rose to prominence as its khans made allies and led raids on the Chinese Jin dynasty. The killing of the khans Qutula and Ambaghai in the 1160s ended this first confederation. The Mongols were reduced to comparative penury; other tribes, such as the Naimans in the west of the plateau and Kerait in the centre, became much more powerful, while the Mongols competed with smaller tribes like the Merkit and the Tatars, the allies of the Jin, in the east and north.

One nephew of Qutula Khan, named Yesugei, had some success fighting against the Tatars, and was a great friend of Toghrul, the khan of the Kerait. With his wife Hö'elün, whom he had abducted from her previous Merkit husband, Yesugei had several children, including a boy named Temüjin (the future Genghis Khan) who was born c. 1162.

A 1278 portrait of Genghis Khan

Yesugei was poisoned by Tatars when Temüjin was still young and Hö'elün's family were abandoned by their tribe on the steppe. They survived the hostility of other tribes and the dangers of the steppe itself, while Temüjin killed his older half-brother to secure his familial position. As an adult, Temüjin formed alliances with Toghrul of the Kerait and an old friend named Jamukha who was now leader of his own tribe; they worked together to retrieve Temüjin's newlywed wife Börte, who had been kidnapped by Merkit raiders in retaliation for Hö'elün's abduction.

The victory over the Merkit brought Temüjin prestige and a considerable following; although he and Jamuqa initially remained close, their individual ambitions soon conflicted and turned hostile. In 1187, Jamukha decisively defeated Temüjin, who took refuge in China. Sponsored by the Jin, he returned to the steppe in 1196 and led a successful campaign with Toghrul against the Tatars in 1196, which re-established his prestige. Temüjin and Toghrul steadily increased their power over the next five years, culminating in a 1201 victory over a coalition led by Jamukha. In 1202, Temüjin eradicated the Tatars; this left the Mongols as the preeminent power in eastern Mongolia. Relations with Toghrul ruptured in 1203, but Temüjin managed to avoid defeat and subdued the Kerait. The Naimans were subjugated and Jamukha was executed in the next two years. With these victories, Temüjin became the undisputed ruler of a newly unified people—the Mongol Empire.

== Military ==
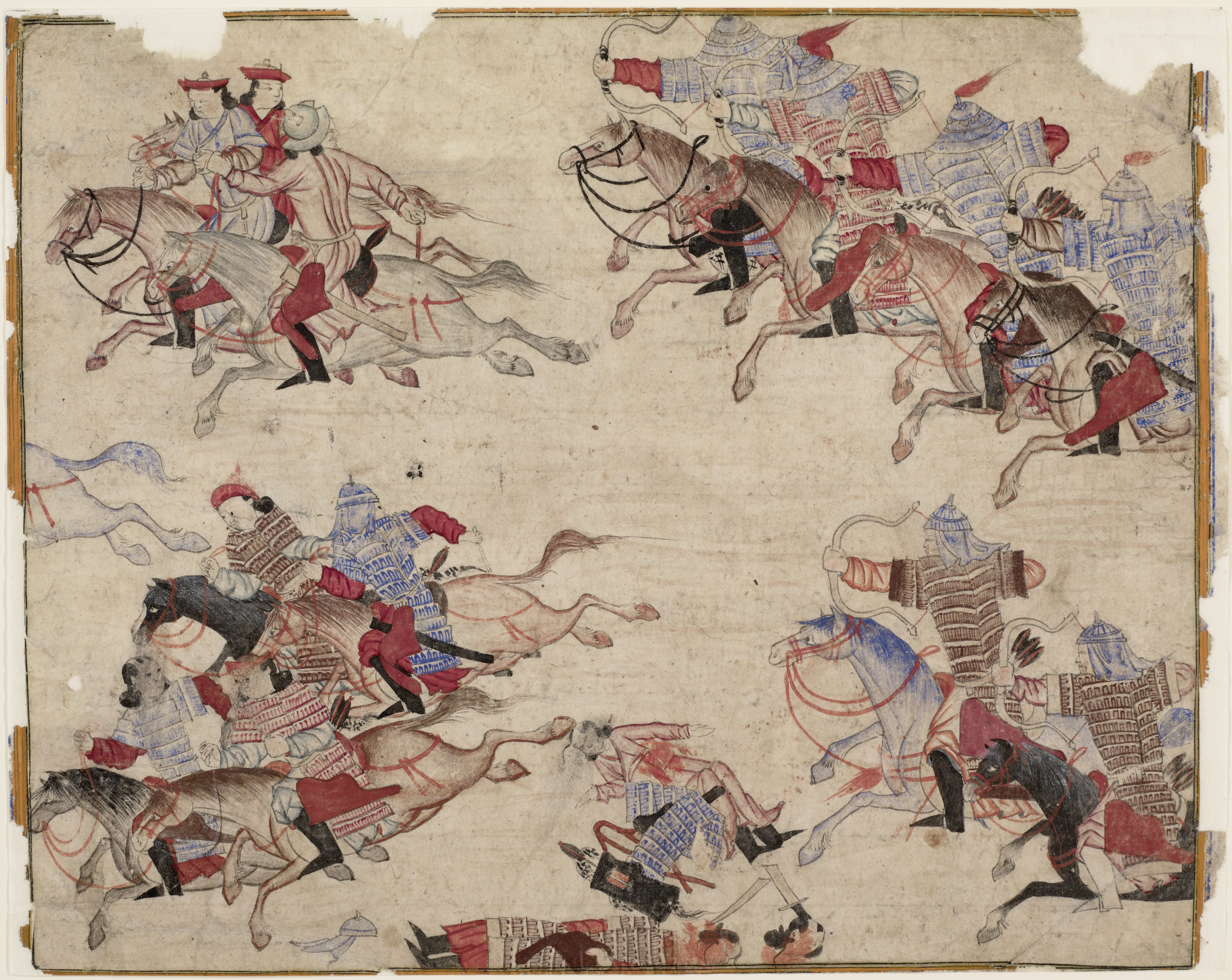
14th-century depiction of Mongol warriors in lamellar armour, on Mongolian ponies and using unique cavalry techniques, pursuing their enemy

The Mongol military eliminated the traditional weaknesses of nomadic armies (Note: Such Eurasian nomads included the Alans, the Huns, the Pannonian Avars, the First and Second Turkic Khaganates, the Khazars, the Uyghur Khaganate, the Oghuz Turks, and the Cumans.) and built upon their tactical strengths to become one of the most formidable armed forces in history. Previous nomadic armies were based on the skill of horse-archers—armoured cavalry able to shoot accurately and quickly with composite bows—who often overwhelmed their enemies with their speed and mobility, ambushes, or feigned retreats. However, their shortcomings included poor siege warfare capabilities, an inability to satisfactorily occupy defeated enemies, and above all a lack of military discipline, which often resulted in disunity or even, after a defeat, disintegration. The reforms initiated by Genghis Khan allowed the Mongol army to resolve these weaknesses, but their capabilities continued to evolve in response to new threats or opportunities to encompass, according to Christopher Atwood, "a vision of comprehensive warfare unique in the Middle Ages".

=== Focus and aims ===
To Genghis Khan, Atwood believes, "war was a personal vendetta against willfully defiant rulers" who had disrespected him or the Mongols. The broadening of these aims into a goal of world conquest was a gradual one; David Morgan argued that the Mongols "came round to the idea when they found that they were, in fact, conquering the world". The attractiveness of the idea was enhanced by the Mongol army's continuous success. By the time of the rule of Güyük Khan (r. 1246–1248), as he stated to the papal envoy Carpini, it had developed into official ideology.

from the rising of the sun to its setting, all the lands have been made subject to me. Who could do this contrary to the command of God?

=== Soldiers, horses, and equipment ===
Every adult (Note: 15 years old or over.) Mongol man was a soldier; when not called up, they resumed their traditional pastoralist way of life. They received no army pay save plunder, which was divided post-battle according to each soldier's contribution. Most were horse-archers, having learned to ride since childhood. The small Mongolian breed was strong, quiet, and particularly hardy—although usually not shod, one could travel 600 miles (970 km) in nine days. A Mongol soldier took on campaign, on average, five or six horses to ride on alternate days. Ill-treatment of horses, such as eating before tending to their needs, could be punishable by death.

The Mongol composite bow, made of wood and horn, had a normal range of around 325 metres (1,066 ft), but in favourable conditions it could reach 530 metres (1,740 ft). (Note: By comparison, the medieval European crossbow was accurate up to 75 metres (246 ft), while the English longbow had an effective range of 220 metres (720 ft).) Mongol soldiers, who all had at least one bow, carried them alongside two or three quivers containing arrows. Most arrowheads were of usual shape and construction, but the Mongols also used special arrows which whistled, stunned, or pierced. A major drawback of the bow was that it could not be used in the rain or damp weather. The Mongols preferred to not engage in close combat with forces who would usually be superior in that aspect, but nevertheless carried a wide range of hand-to-hand weaponry, including lances, maces, axes, spears, or clubs. The majority of Mongol soldiers had little or no armour, wearing as little as a deel (heavy coat) with an undergarment of dog or goat skin, accompanied by thick felt boots and fur hats. Wealthier Mongols could afford lamellar armour, preferred to metal mail because of its easy manufacture and greater effectiveness against arrows. Conical helmets were usually made of iron. Shields were used by sentries or by dismounted cavalry. Soldiers also had to carry equipment, including their tents.

=== Organisation and preparation ===
To ensure the old tribal loyalties disappeared, Genghis Khan assigned the soldiers of each tribe to different units, divided using a decimal system, of his army. Another critical reform was the institution of strict military discipline across the whole army from general down to common soldier. Officers were responsible for the training and equipping of the men under their command; comrades in units were ordered to protect each other in battle; and individual soldiers were forbidden from fleeing or looting without permission. If any soldier or unit failed in their duties, they were liable to be punished, often with execution. Institutions such as the layout of army camps or the operation chain of command were standardised, and the role of the keshig (imperial guard) was centred to ensure it served as a military academy for future generals.

The cohesion and unity of the Mongol military was a much greater factor in their success than any numerical superiority— the total strength available in Genghis's lifetime was likely between only 50,000 and 75,000 soldiers, and Mongol armies were almost always outnumbered. Before the division of the empire, the army was divided into five formations: the regular army, the alginchin and tamma frontier troops, who served as scouts and nomadic garrisons respectively, the keshig, and the qara'ul/qaraghul, whose function is unclear but may have included guarding roads and the frontier. All soldiers received a distinctive haircut, the uniqueness of which discouraged desertion.

The Mongols were accustomed to rest in late spring and summer. Campaigns were planned at summer kurultai. Here, commanders were appointed and plans drawn up, often using military intelligence gathered from merchants or their own scouting networks. Mongol war plans balanced independent tactical thinking by commanders with a strict strategic timetable. This allowed coordinated movements between divisions hundreds of miles apart before they rendezvoused at pre-selected locations. Preparations would begin in autumn, and the campaign usually started in winter—unlike their enemies, the Mongols favoured fighting in cold weather.

=== Strategy and tactics ===
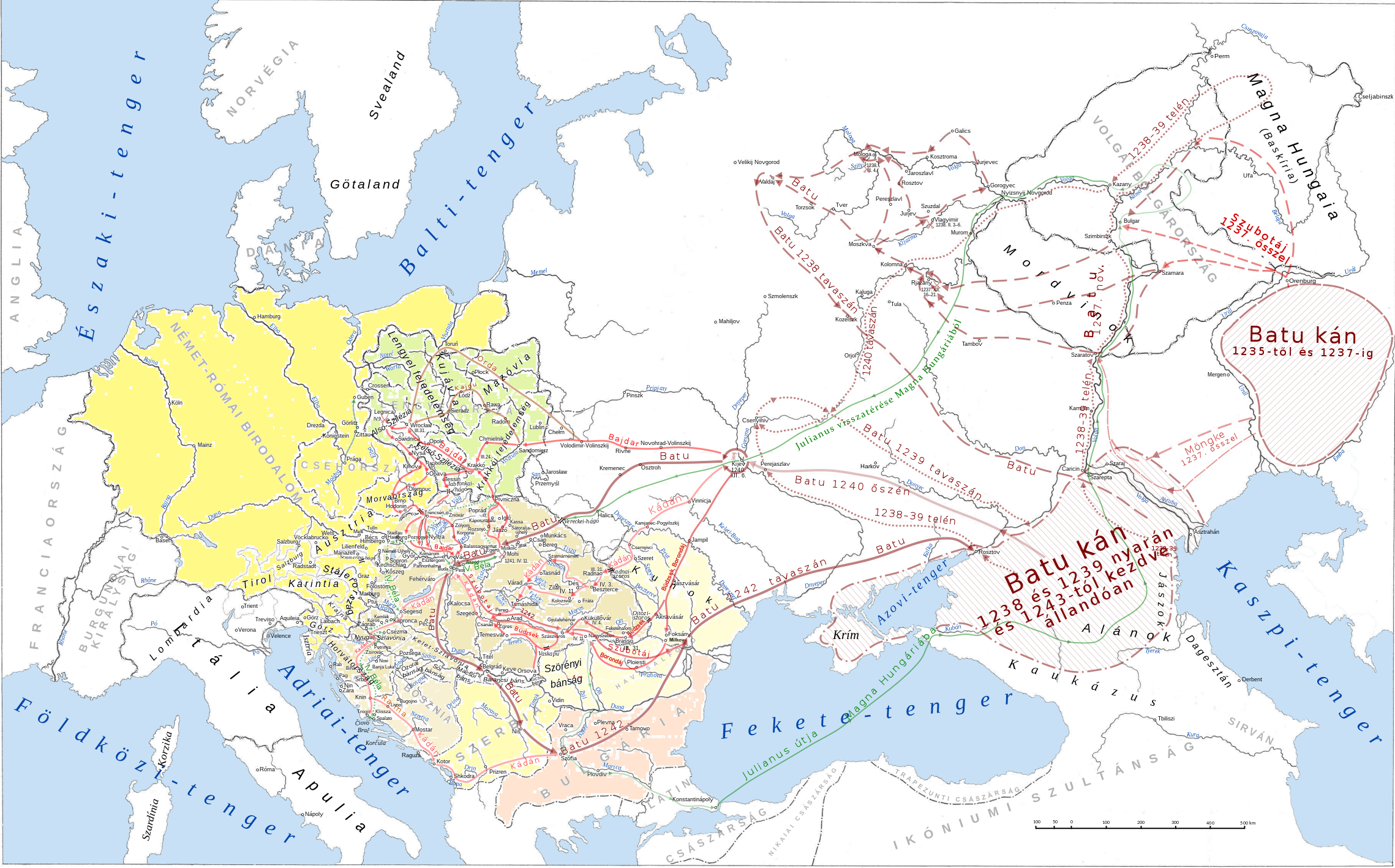
Map of the Mongol invasion of Europe, showing the paths of individual columns dozens of miles apart which coordinated their movements to high levels of strategic precision

The Mongols usually planned a multi-pronged invasion, relying on their plans and scouting networks to allow individual columns to join with others. Moving armies were protected from surprise attacks by scouting screens which ranged tens or hundreds of kilometers around the main force. They preferred to provoke the enemy ruler into an initial battlefield confrontation in which Mongol combat skill would prove decisive, followed by the destruction of smaller strongholds, and then the capture of the enemy capital. This sequence cut off any hierarchical communication, encouraged refugees to flee to the capital, decreasing the inhabitants' morale and supplies, and allowed the Mongols to obtain labour and materials to attack the best-defended fortresses. Often the enemy ruler was intensively pursued to prevent any force rallying around him. Similarly, individual divisions would unpredictably attack individual strongholds before quickly withdrawing, preventing local lords from helping their neighbours. (Note: Timothy May, terming this the Mongols' "Tsunami Strategy", emphasises that it was not a scorched earth policy designed to make the region uninhabitable, but rather one aimed at halting and destroying any remaining military capability.)

Mongol military tactics exploited their mastery as horse archers, emphasised their mobility, flexibility, and organisation, and generally aimed for a decisive total victory. They included traditional steppe tactics such as ambushes or the famous feigned retreat, which often lasted days before the Mongols confronted their tired pursuers on their chosen battlefield. Other tactics included hit-and-run barrages which resembled the later European caracole, specialised formations which disrupted enemy troops, or an "arrow storm" tactic which used the principle of concentrated firepower against a kill zone. Encirclement tactics were practised during the nerge great hunts, during which the Mongols formed circles many kilometres wide which gradually contracted, herding animals towards the center; these hunts were sometimes used to extinguish guerilla resistance.

The Mongols were initially poor at siege warfare, only being able to conquer walls with the element of surprise. However, they quickly learnt to incorporate Muslim and Chinese siege engineers into their armies. These artillery experts were used, in addition to sieges, on the battlefield, in naval warfare, and in logistics. Their equipment included trebuchets, mangonels, exploding shells, flaming naphtha, and the world's earliest-known cannon, dating from the late 13th century; their tactics included sapping, night attacks, and diverted bodies of water. The Mongols heavily used prisoners of war as forced labour and human shields during sieges. The spread of the Mongol military played a key role in technological diffusion across Eurasia, such as the transmission of trebuchets to China and gunpowder warfare to Europe. Naval warfare was generally only practised by the successor state of the Yuan dynasty.

Mongol armies also utilised terror tactics, psychological warfare, and propaganda. The population of captured cities, aside from useful individuals such as craftsmen, were usually massacred. The Mongols encouraged news of these events to be exaggerated and spread as widely as possible, to terrify potential targets into surrendering before a costly siege. They exaggerated the size of their armies with rumours, dummies mounted on spare horses, or extra fires lit at night camps; they promoted rebellion in enemy territory; and they sought to pit potential rivals against each other. Several accounts record that Mongol shamans were believed to play pivotal roles in summoning rainstorms or snowstorms which hindered enemy forces.

== China ==
=== Western Xia ===
The 1203 flight of their defeated Kerait enemies drew the attention of the Mongols south to their refuge, the sedentary state of Western Xia, located on the Gansu corridor. Although the Kerait were soon expelled for plundering the natives, Genghis ordered raids on the border territories in retribution in 1205 and in 1207, sacking the town of Wuluhai on the Yellow River. These raids gathered plunder, supplies, and intelligence. The Xia ruler Emperor Xiangzong requested aid against the Mongols from the neighbouring Jin dynasty, who refused with the comment:

...it is to our advantage when our enemies attack one another. Wherein lies the danger to us?

==== First invasion ====
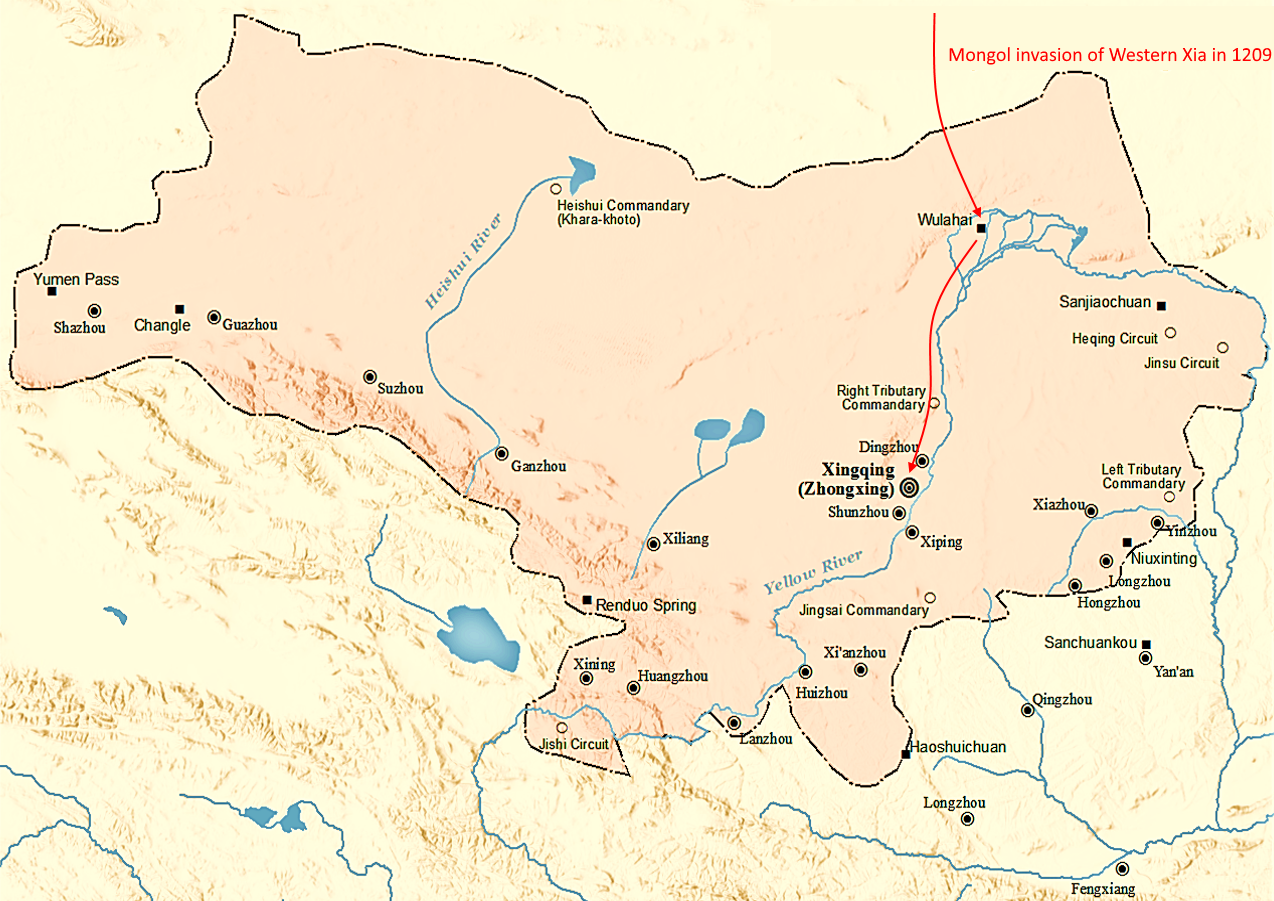
Mongol invasion of Western Xia in 1209

In April 1209, Genghis launched a full-scale invasion of the Western Xia, aiming to conquer 400 kilometres (250 mi) of territory and take the Xia capital of Zhongxingfu. Why Genghis escalated from raiding is unclear, though the simultaneous submission of the Uyghurs and the Qarluqs may have played a role. Initial Xia resistance was fierce and repelled the Mongols, albeit with Pyrrhic casualties. Although the Mongols initially failed to provoke the Xia into attacking, another feigned retreat in August inflicted an overwhelming defeat on Xia forces.

In autumn 1209, the Mongols attacked into the Alashan Mountains again and this time devastated the Xia armies, winning three battles and taking several towns. However, their siege of Zhongxingfu proved difficult as they had no better siege equipment than crude battering rams. In late October, an impatient Genghis ordered that dykes be built to divert the Yellow River into the city; the tactic initially worked, and by January the city was on the brink of capture, but then the earthworks burst and flooded the Mongol camp. The Xia nevertheless sued for peace, believing that continual resistance against a superior military was futile. In exchange for peace, Genghis received Xia as a vassal state, one of Emperor Xiangzong's daughters to marry, a large tribute of camels, falcons, and cloth, and a promise that Xia troops would assist the Mongol army. (Note: Xiangzong made sure to emphasise that the troops he could provide would not be nomadic cavalry, the Xia having long since become sedentary.)

==== Truce and second invasion ====
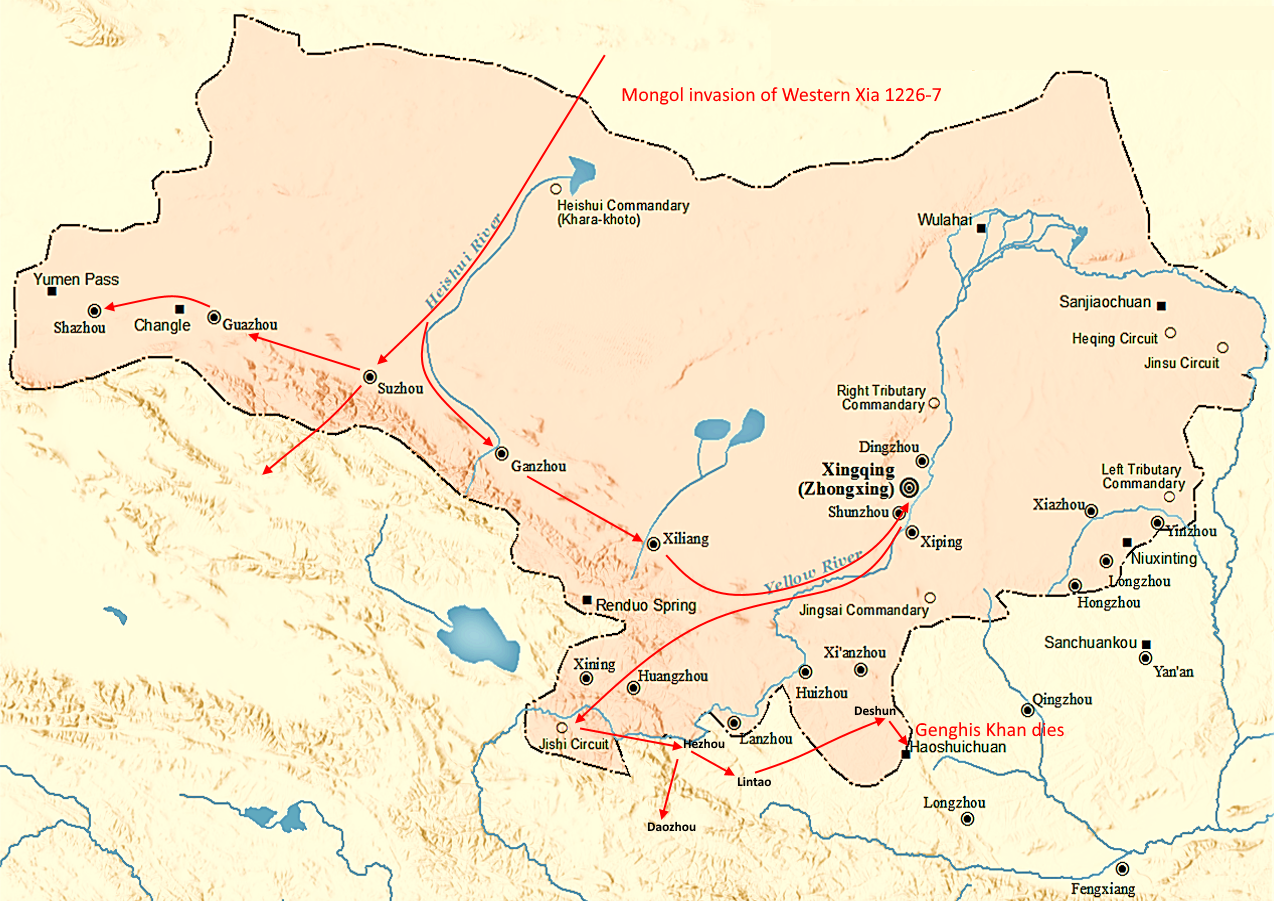
Mongol invasion of Western Xia, 1226-1227

The Xia supported the Mongols during their subsequent wars against the Jin dynasty, which they initially took advantage of to assert old territorial grudges. However, the Xia became increasingly weary of Genghis's annual demands for their heavy cavalry to support Mongol troops. In 1217, they outright refused, provoking a punitive Mongol expedition which surrounded Zhongxingfu for several months. While they did not provide troops for the forthcoming invasion of the Khwarazmian Empire in 1218, traditionally recorded as the cause of their eventual downfall, it was more likely because they were already heavily supporting the campaigns of Muqali, who Genghis left behind to deal with the Jin. In 1222, the Xia even offered Muqali an extra 50,000 troops. However, the Xia by then deeply resented the Mongols' dismissive attitude towards them, and in 1222–23 they broke off relations and re-allied with the Jin, who wanted to buy Xia horses.

Muqali fought both the Jin and Xia until his death in 1223, and his son Bo'ol continued until late 1224, when he travelled to Mongolia to greet the returned Genghis Khan. Genghis attempted to make peace with the Xia, but no Xia noble was willing to become a hostage in Mongolia, so negotiations broke down. In spring 1226 the Mongols attacked from the northwest at Khara-Khoto. The cities of the Hexi Corridor including Suzhou, Ganzhou, and Xiliangfu, were captured easily, since the Mongol army was now experienced in siege warfare, while the elderly Genghis directed operations from the cooler Qilian Mountains. In late 1226 the Mongols crossed the frozen Yellow River, routed a large Xia relief force, sacked Lingzhou in December, and besieged Zhongxingfu. The city held out for half a year, while Genghis directed operations against both holdouts in the Hexi Corridor and the Jin border. He died in the Liupan Mountains in August 1227. The Mongols suppressed news of his death before the capture of Zhongxingfu, whose population was massacred, including the royal family. The territory and population of the Xia were incorporated into the Mongol Empire.

=== Jin dynasty ===
==== Initial invasions (1208–1215) ====
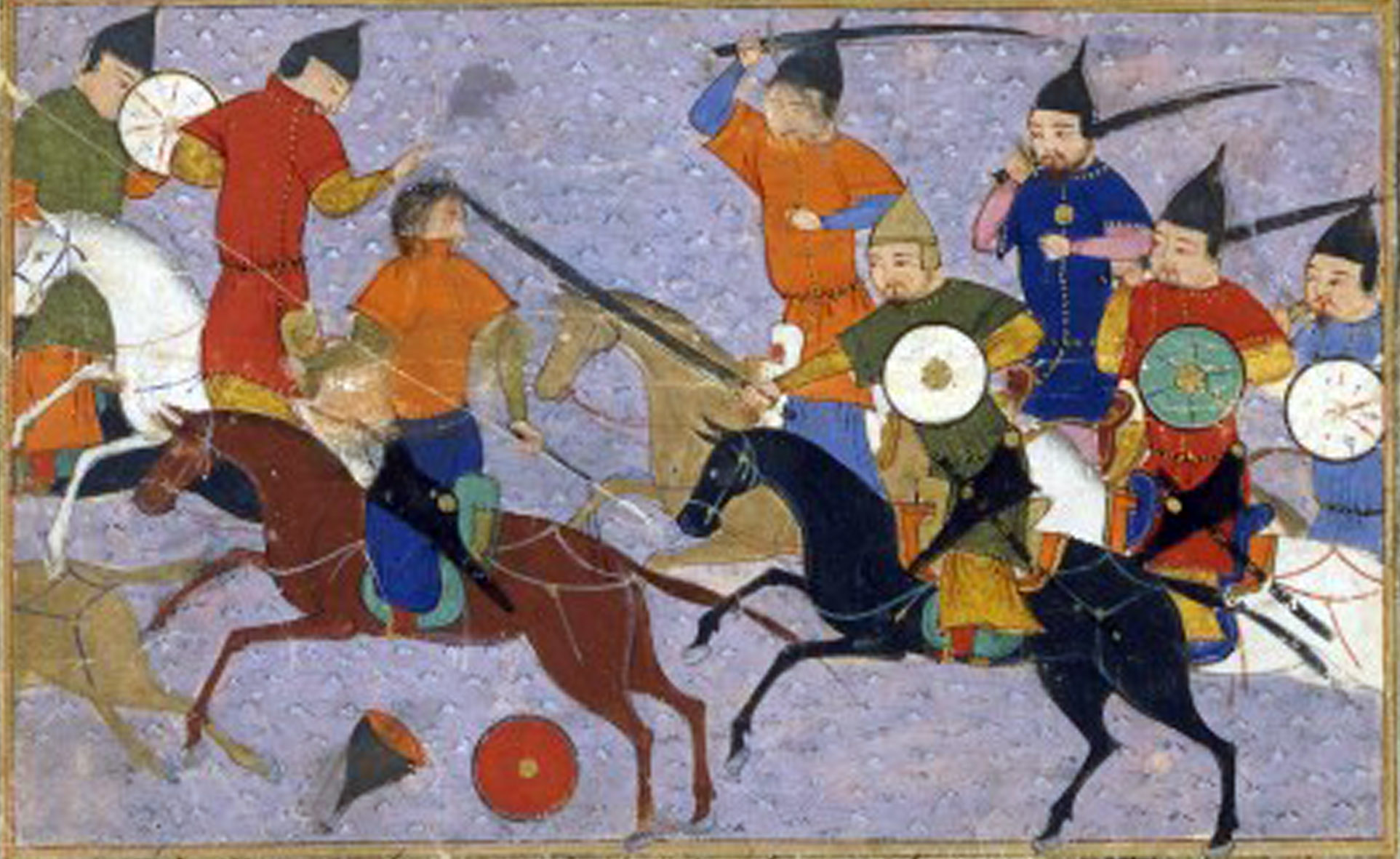
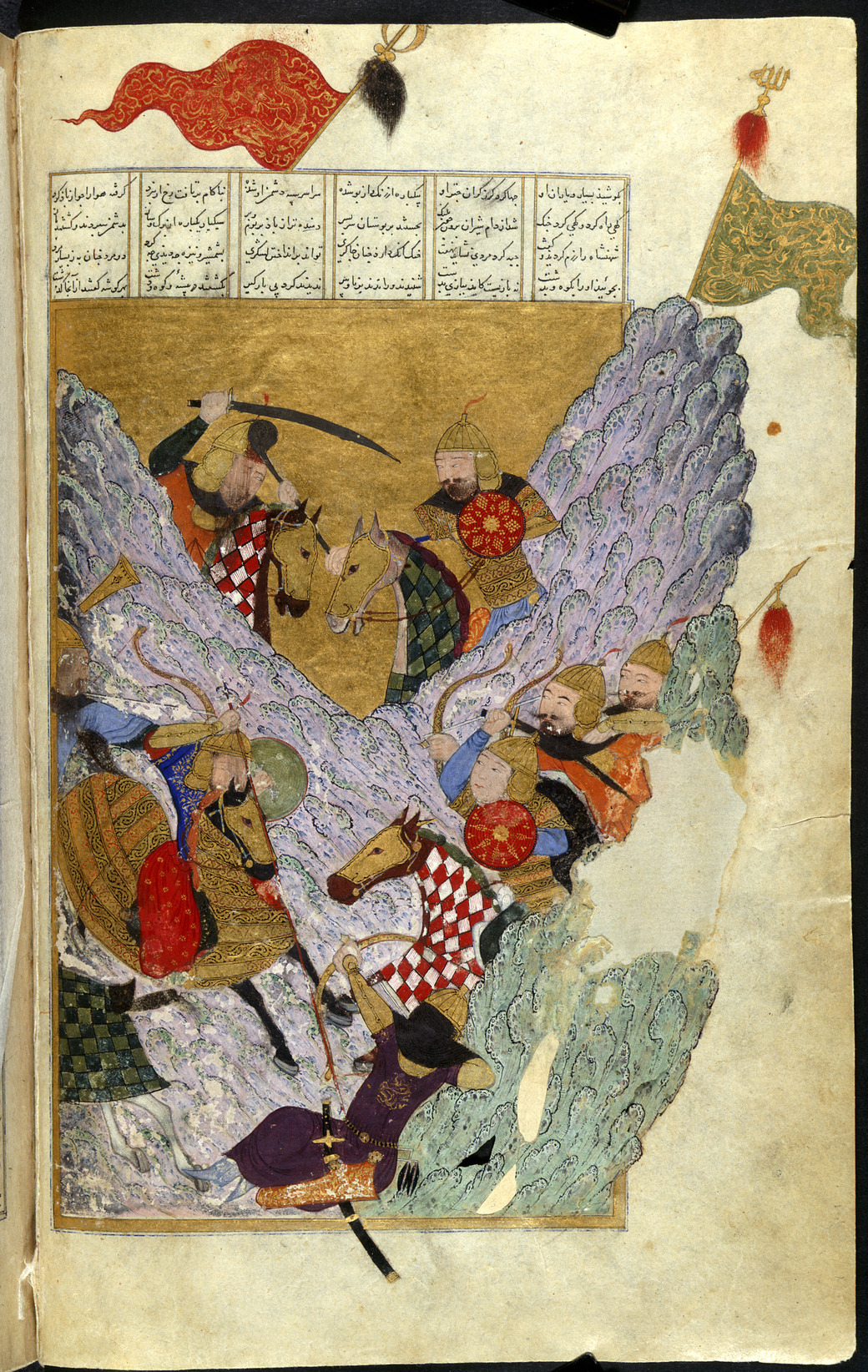
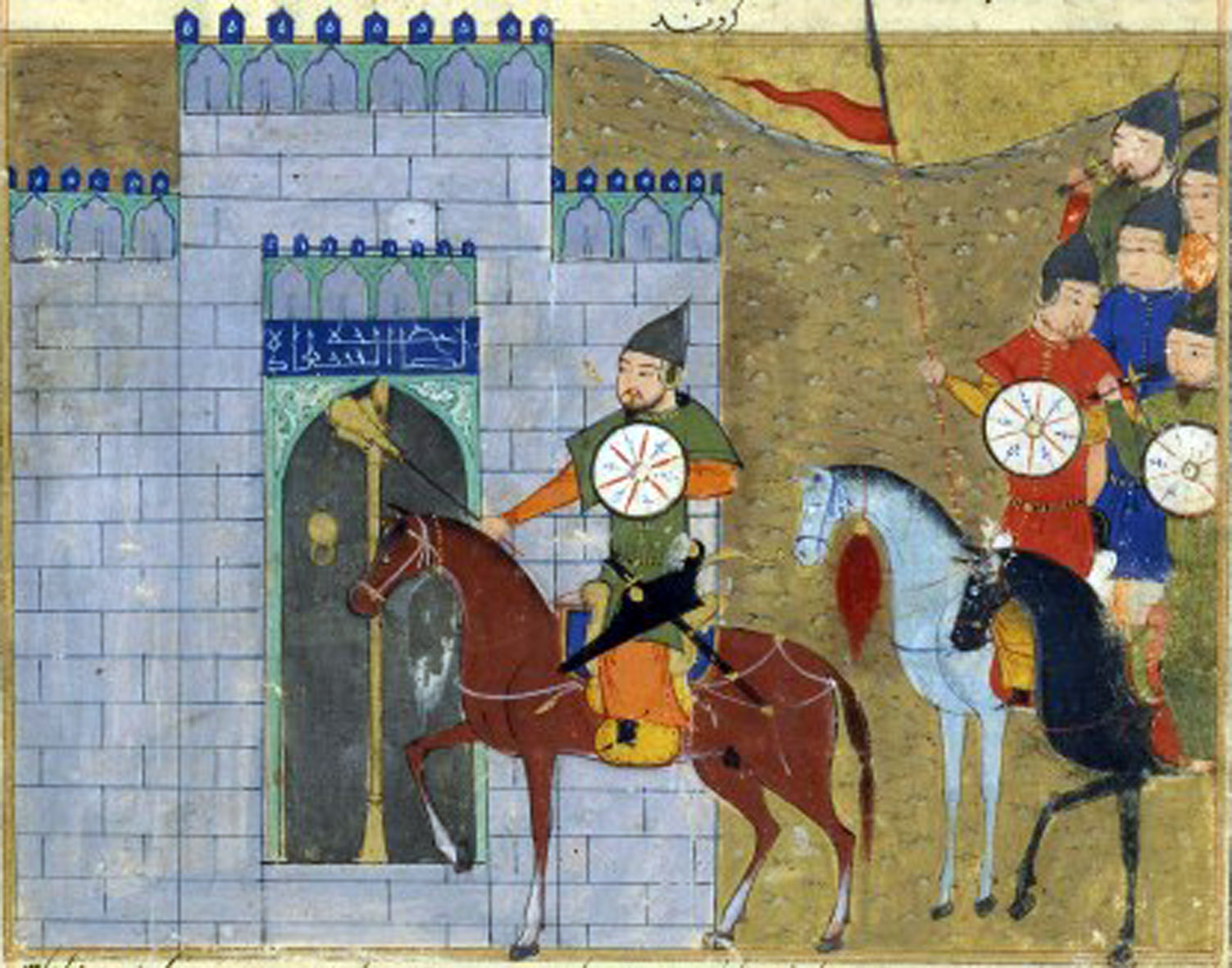
Depictions of Mongol-Jin conflict from 14th-century Persian manuscripts. From top: the Yehuling Campaign (1211); a skirmish between Mongol and Jin cavalry; the Mongol general Samuqa besieging Zhongdu in 1215.

Genghis had planned to attack the Jin dynasty since 1206, but had waited to secure his other borders first. He had several reasons for commencing warfare: to pay his soldiers through plundering the riches of North China, to avenge the long-past murder of his kinsman Ambaghai Khan, to excise any semblance of Mongol subservience to the Jin, and even simply because he hated Wanyan Yongji, the Jin emperor. Although his army was outnumbered by approximately ten-to-one, (Note: The historian Paul Ratchnevsky estimated the Mongol army in 1211 at 65,000 soldiers with 10,000 allies, while the Jin had 500,000 infantry and 120,000 cavalry.) Genghis opened hostilities in 1210 by refusing to pay tribute.

Mongol armies marched forth in spring 1211 in two divisions: the right (western) wing under Genghis's sons Jochi, Chagatai, and Ögedei captured several cities in the area of modern Hohhot, while Genghis himself led the centre and left (eastern) wings to attack the Jin's northern frontier. In this Yehuling Campaign, Mongol armies crossed through "Wild Fox Pass" (Note: Chinese: 野狐嶺; pinyin: Yěhúlǐng) and inflicted a heavy defeat on Jin forces at the Battle of Huihe River on 26 September. Forces under Jebe then broke through the key Juyong Pass, which guarded the road to the Jin capital at Zhongdu, in October, and pillaged the city's environs until January 1212. In February, the Mongols retreated and captured three large cities north of the Juyong Pass; Muqali decisively defeated a large Jin reinforcement army at the Battle of Huanrzui that month. The aim of the 1211–1212 campaign was not to conquer territory, but as a chevauchée to plunder, gather information, and diminish Jin control in North China, before returning to Mongolia.

Genghis began a second campaign in August–October 1212. The Mongols crossed the Wild Fox Pass again and recaptured Xuandezhou (Chinese: 宣德州, present-day Xuanhua) on the road to the Juyong Pass; although Genghis's son Tolui scaled the walls of nearby Dexingfu (Chinese: 德興府, present-day Zhuolu), the Mongols were unable to recapture it. Genghis personally laid siege to Datong, but although the Mongols obliterated a Jin army, the campaign nearly ended in disaster when the khan was wounded by an arrow, after which the Mongol armies withdrew. The only other battle was Jebe's capture of Dongjing (Chinese: 東京, present-day Liaoyang) on 5 January 1213 using a feigned retreat, although his army soon withdrew.

Mongol armies returned in August 1213 and besieged Xuandezhou and Dexingfu for a third time, capturing both. They then defeated a huge army (estimated by contemporary chronicles at 100,000—300,000 troops) at Huailai; it was said that Jin corpses covered the ground for 40 li. However, the Juyong Pass had been refortified strongly, and the Mongols were unable to quickly take it. In October Genghis's old ally, the merchant Ja'far Khwaja, guided a Mongol column through a smuggling route (Note: The Zijingguan Pass Chinese: 紫荊関) to the southwest to flank the Jin garrison of the Juyong Pass, who were trapped and massacred. The Mongols thereafter controlled access to North China, which was in a state of chaos—the Jin general Hushahu had murdered Wanyan Yonji and set up a puppet ruler, (Note: Hushahu was the Jin general who had been defeated comprehensively at the Battle of Huanrzui ("Badger's Mouth") in February 1212.) while rebellions had arisen in Jin territory, such as the Eastern Xia which took over Manchuria.

From December, the Mongols pillaged the entire North China plain in three divisions. While they failed to capture Zhongdu and increasingly suffered from disease, the Jin capital was also starving. Hushahu had been overthrown in November 1213, and the new Jin administration was receptive to peace terms. The treaty was signed on 30 April 1214, with terms including expensive tribute and humiliatingly, the concession of a Jin princess for Genghis to marry. The armies began returning to Mongolia in May. However, the peace was short-lived, as the new Jin emperor moved their capital south to the more-defensible Kaifeng. While many Jin mutinies broke out at this sign of weakness, Genghis was also enraged and regarded the move as a violation of the treaty. The Mongols invaded again in June, and while Muqali was deputised to attack Manchuria, Zhongdu was again besieged in the winter. This time, the weakened city could not hold out and it surrendered on 31 May 1215. By 1215, Genghis Khan's aims included territorial conquest.

== East Asia ==
The Yuan dynasty established the top-level government agency Bureau of Buddhist and Tibetan Affairs to govern Tibet, which was conquered by the Mongols and put under Yuan rule. The Mongols also invaded Sakhalin Island between 1264 and 1308. Likewise, Korea (Goryeo) became a semi-autonomous vassal state of the Yuan dynasty for about 80 years.

== Central Asia ==
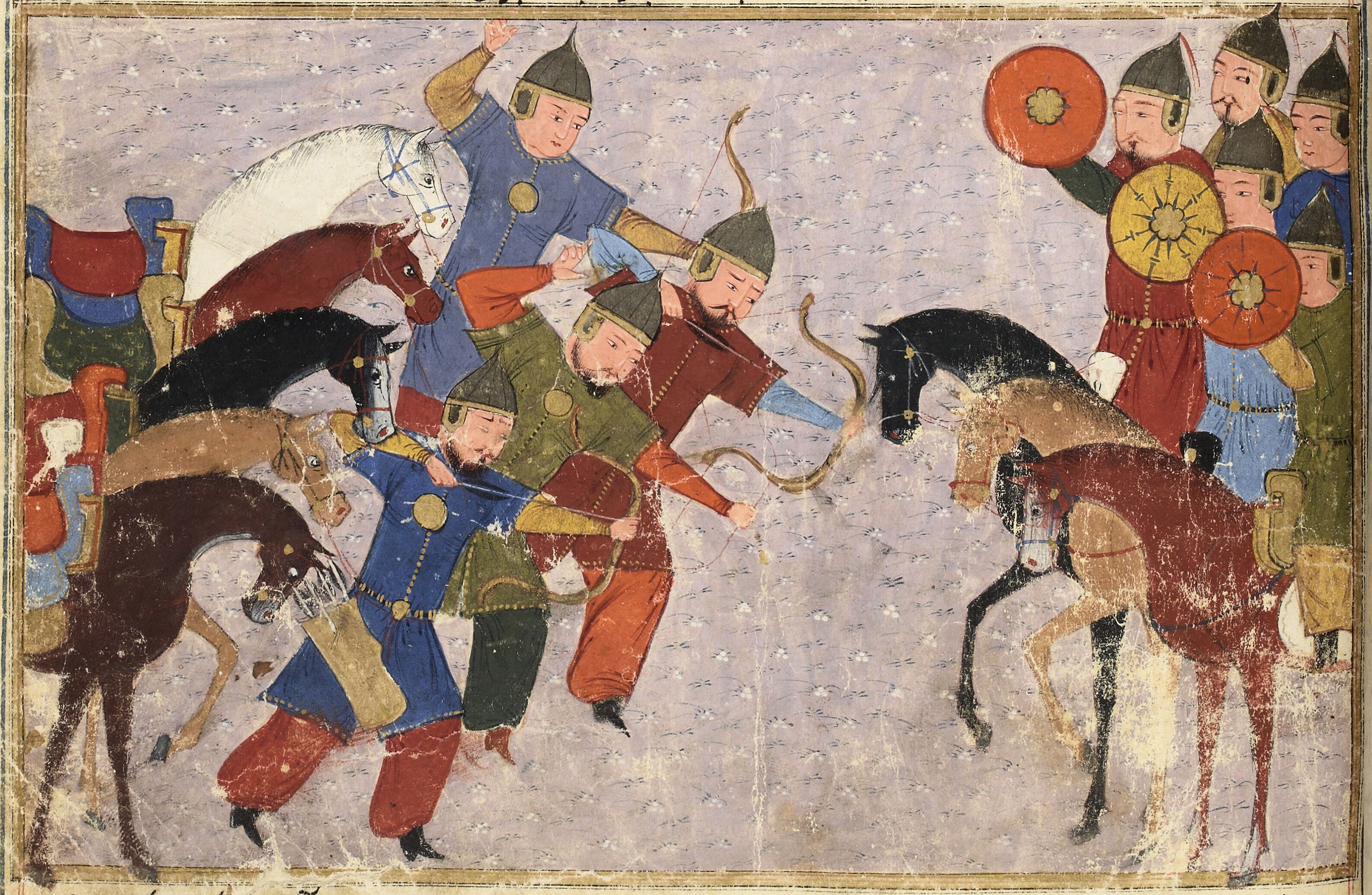
Battle of Vâliyân (Spring of 1221) during the invasion of the Khwarazmian Empire

Genghis Khan forged the initial Mongol Empire in Central Asia, starting with the unification of the nomadic tribes of the Merkits, Tatars, Keraites, Turks, Naimans, and Mongols. The Buddhist Uyghurs of Qocho surrendered and joined the empire. He then continued expansion via conquest of the Qara Khitai and of the Khwarazmian Empire.

Large areas of Islamic Central Asia and northeastern Persia were seriously depopulated, as every city or town that resisted the Mongols was destroyed. Each soldier was given a quota of enemies to execute according to circumstances. For example, after the conquest of Urgench, each Mongol warrior – in an army of perhaps two tumens (20,000 troops) – was required to execute 24 people, or nearly half a million people per said army.

Against the Alans and the Cumans (Kipchaks), the Mongols used divide-and-conquer tactics by first warning the Cumans to end their support of the Alans, whom they then defeated, before rounding on the Cumans. The Alans were recruited into the Mongol forces and known as the Asud, with one unit called "Right Alan Guard" that was combined with "recently surrendered" soldiers. Mongols and Chinese soldiers stationed in the area of the former state of Qocho and in Besh Balikh established a Chinese military colony led by Chinese general Qi Kongzhi.

== Europe ==
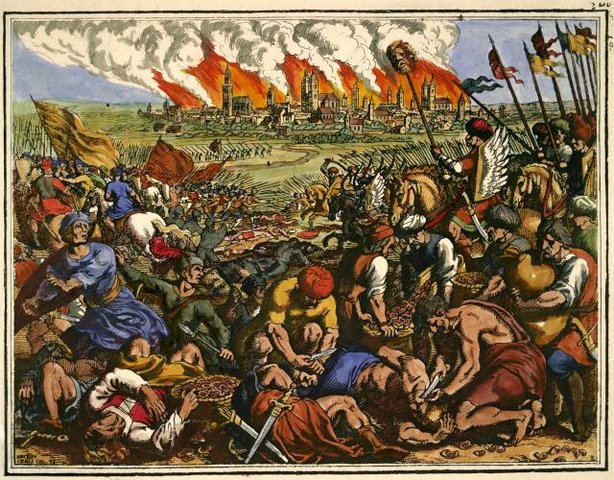
The Battle of Legnica took place during the first Mongol invasion of Poland.

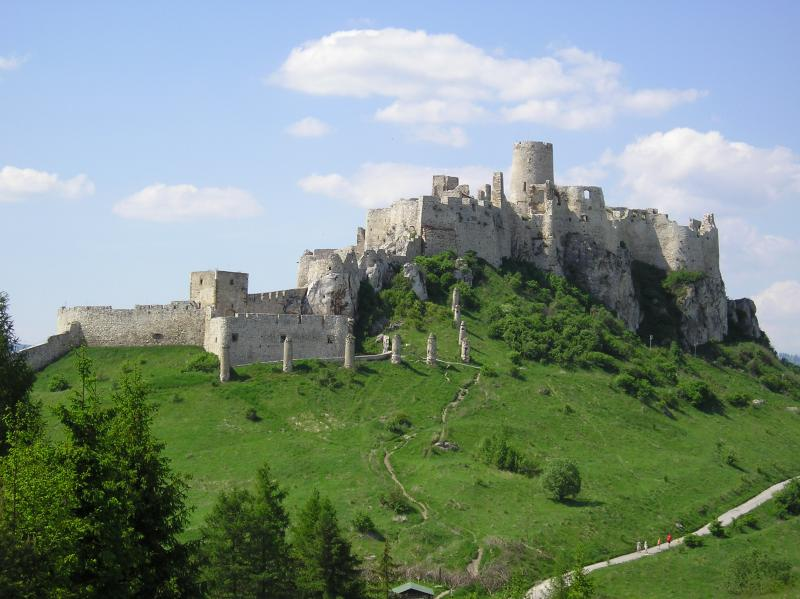
The Mongol invasion in the 13th century led to construction of mighty stone castles, such as Spiš Castle in Slovakia.

The Mongols invaded and destroyed Volga Bulgaria and Kievan Rus', before invading Poland, Bulgaria, Hungary and other territories. Over the course of three years (1237–1240), the Mongols razed all the major cities of Russia with the exceptions of Novgorod and Pskov.

Giovanni da Pian del Carpine, the Pope's envoy to the Mongol Great Khan, traveled through Kiev in February 1246 and wrote:

They [the Mongols] attacked Russia, where they made great havoc, destroying cities and fortresses and slaughtering men; and they laid siege to Kiev, the capital of Russia; after they had besieged the city for a long time, they took it and put the inhabitants to death. When we were journeying through that land we came across countless skulls and bones of dead men lying about on the ground. Kiev had been a very large and thickly populated town, but now it has been reduced almost to nothing, for there are at the present time scarce two hundred houses there and the inhabitants are kept in complete slavery.

The Mongol invasions displaced populations on a scale never seen before in Central Asia or Eastern Europe. Word of the Mongol hordes' approach spread terror and panic. The violent character of the invasions acted as a catalyst for further violence between Europe's elites and sparked additional conflicts. The increase in violence in the affected Eastern European regions correlates with a decrease in the elite's numerical skills, and has been postulated as a root of the Great Divergence.

== Middle East ==
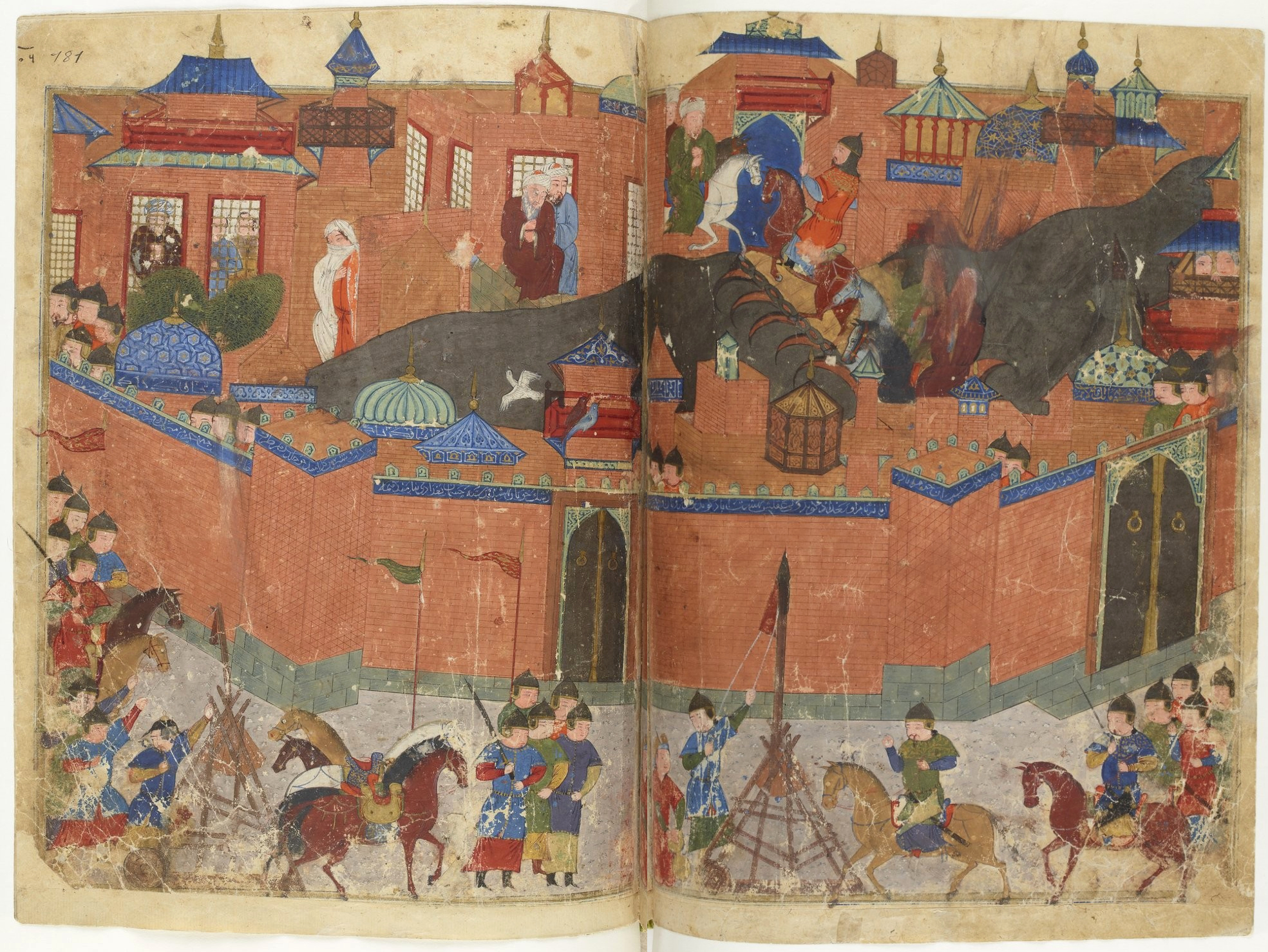
Siege of Baghdad in 1258

The Mongols conquered, by battle or voluntary surrender, the areas of present-day Iran, Iraq, the Caucasus, and parts of Syria and Turkey, with further Mongol raids reaching southwards into Palestine as far as Gaza in 1260 and 1300. The major battles were the siege of Baghdad, when the Mongols sacked the city which had been the center of Islamic power for 500 years and the Battle of Ain Jalut in 1260 in southeastern Galilee, when the Muslim Bahri Mamluks were able to defeat the Mongols and decisively halt their advance for the first time. One thousand North Chinese engineer squads accompanied the Mongol Hulagu Khan during his conquest of the Middle East.

== North Asia ==
By 1206, Genghis Khan had conquered all Mongol and Turkic tribes in Mongolia and southern Siberia. In 1207, his eldest son Jochi subjugated the Siberian forest people, the Uriankhai, the Oirats, Barga, Khakas, Buryats, Tuvans, Khori-Tumed, and Yenisei Kyrgyz according to chapter 5 of the Secret History of the Mongols. He then organized the Siberians into three tumens. He gave the Telengits and Tolos along the Irtysh River to an old companion, Qorchi. While the Barga, Tumed, Buryats, Khori, Keshmiti, and Bashkirs were organized in separate thousands, the Telengits, Tolos, Oirats, and Yenisei Kyrgyz were numbered into the regular tumens. Genghis created a settlement of Chinese craftsmen and farmers at Kem-Kemchik after the first phase of the Mongol conquest of the Jin dynasty. The khagans favored gyrfalcons, furs, women, and Yenisei Kyrgyz horses for tribute.

Western Siberia came under control of the Golden Horde. The descendants of Orda Khan, the eldest son of Jochi, directly ruled the area. In the swamps of western Siberia, dog sled yam stations were set up to facilitate collection of tribute.

In 1270, Kublai Khan sent a Chinese official, with a new batch of settlers, to serve as judge of the Kyrgyz and Tuvan basin areas (益蘭州 and 謙州). Ogedei's grandson Kaidu occupied portions of central Siberia from 1275 on. The Yuan dynasty army under Kublai's Kipchak general Tutugh reoccupied the Yenisei Kyrgyz lands in 1293. From then on, the Yuan dynasty controlled large portions of central and eastern Siberia.

== South Asia ==
From 1221 to 1327, the Mongol Empire launched several invasions into the Indian subcontinent. The Mongols occupied parts of northwestern South Asia for decades. However, they failed to penetrate past the outskirts of Delhi and were repelled from the interior of India. Centuries later, the Mughals, whose founder Babur had Mongol roots, established their own empire in India.

== Southeast Asia ==
Kublai Khan's Yuan dynasty was initially successful invading Burma between 1277 and 1287 and led to the capitulation and disintegration of the Pagan Kingdom but failed to hold it as the Burmese revolt quickly overthrew the Mongol puppet government and rallied under the new Myinsaing Kingdom. The invasion of 1301 to retake Burma was defeated and the Mongols abandoned all ambitions towards Burma. The Mongol invasions of Vietnam (Đại Việt) and Java had a similar pattern, largely dominating in open field but were ultimately worn down through irregular warfare and the local environment which ultimately resulted in defeat for the Mongols, although much of Southeast Asia agreed to pay tribute to avoid further bloodshed.

The Mongol invasions played an indirect role in the establishment of major Tai states in the region by recently migrated Tais, who originally came from Southern China, in the early centuries of the second millennium. Major Tai states such as Lan Na, Sukhothai, and Lan Xang appeared around this time.

== See also ==
- Destruction under the Mongol Empire
- Slave trade in the Mongol Empire
- Division of the Mongol Empire
- Lists of battles of the Mongol invasion of Europe
  - List of battles of the Mongol invasion of Kievan Rus'
- Military of the Mongol Empire
- Mongol invasion of Europe
- Political divisions and vassals of the Mongol Empire
- Timeline of the Mongol Empire
  - Timeline of the Golden Horde
