= Sieges of Zhongdu =

Mongol conquest of Zhongdu, now modern-day Bejing

Siege of Zhongdu
- Part of the Mongol conquest of the Jin dynasty
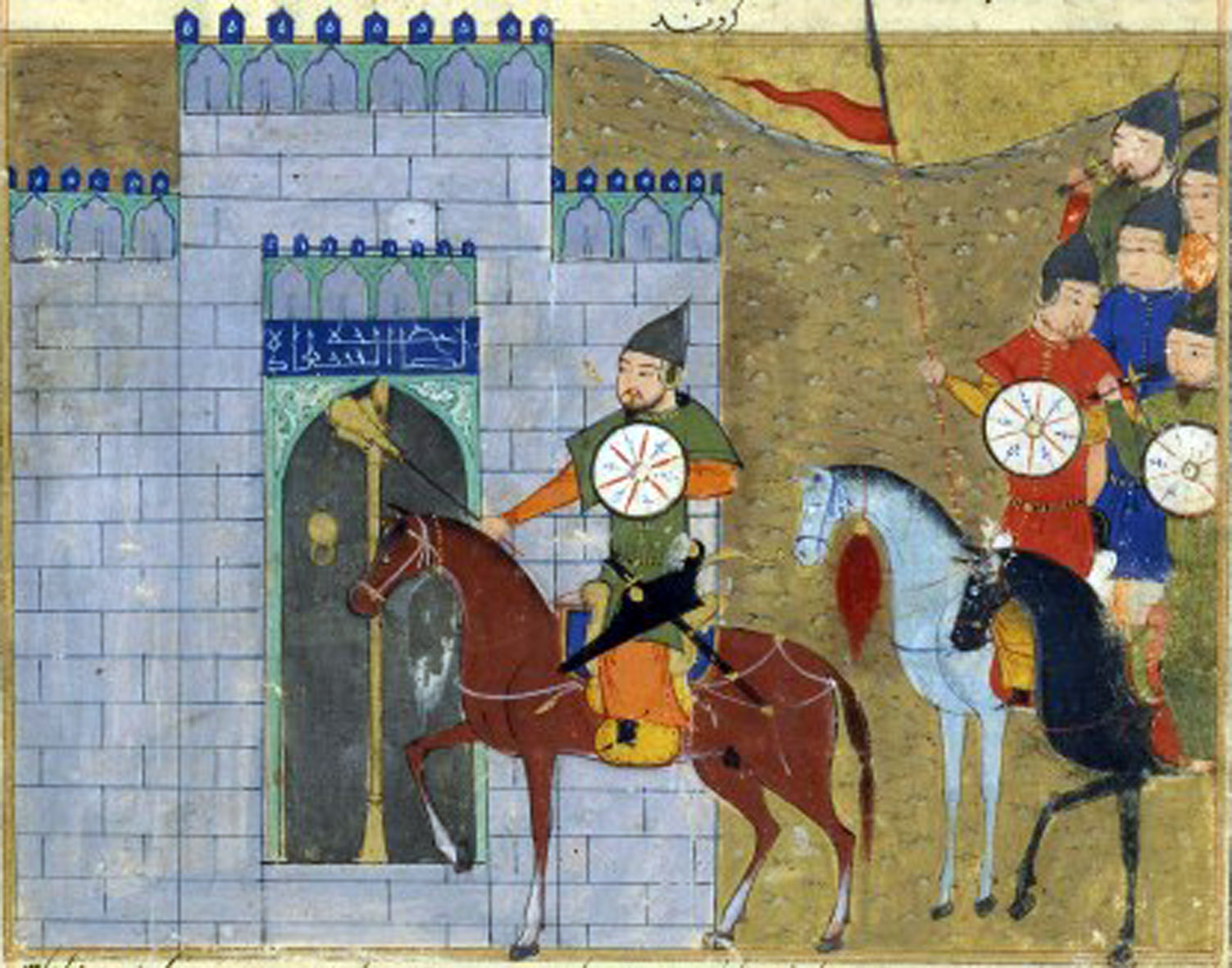
- The siege of Zhongdu (modern Beijing), as depicted in the Persian Jami' al-tawarikh by Rashid-al-Din Hamadani
Date	1213–31 May 1215
Location	Zhongdu (present-day Beijing), Jin dynasty, China 39°54′24″N 116°23′51″E
Result	Mongol victory

Belligerents
Mongol Empire	Jin dynasty

Commanders and leaders
Genghis Khan; Shimo Ming'an; Samuqa	Emperor Xuanzong

Casualties and losses
Significant, mostly from disease	Heavy
- Location of the siege on a map of modern China

The Sieges of Zhongdu took place in 1214 and 1215 during the Mongol conquest of the Jin dynasty. Zhongdu, the capital of the Jin dynasty and located in present-day Beijing, was progressively isolated by the forces of the Mongol Empire under Genghis Khan. After earlier Mongol incursions and the relocation of the Jin court to Kaifeng, the city endured prolonged blockade and famine before surrendering in June 1215. The Fall of Zhongdu marked a decisive blow to Jin authority in northern China and accelerated the dynasty’s decline.

== Background ==
By 1206, the Mongol chieftain Temüjin had subdued all rivals on the Mongolian plateau. At a kurultai (assembly) in that year, he formally adopted a new title—Genghis Khan—as the ruler of a new nation, the nascent Mongol Empire. His first military operations against a sedentary state took place against the Western Xia dynasty: in 1209–1210, the Mongol army secured the submission of the Xia and a large tribute. However, this was a prelude aimed at securing his southern border before attacking his real target, the Jin dynasty in North China.

Genghis had several reasons for waging war: to pay his soldiers through plundering the riches of North China, to avenge the long-past murder of his kinsman Ambaghai Khan, to excise any semblance of Mongol subservience to the Jin, and even simply because he hated Wanyan Yongji, the Jin emperor. Although his army was outnumbered by approximately ten-to-one (the historian Paul Ratchnevsky estimated the Mongol army in 1211 at 65,000 soldiers with 10,000 allies, while the Jin had 500,000 infantry and 120,000 cavalry) Genghis opened hostilities in 1210 by refusing to pay tribute.

In spring 1211, the Mongol invasions of the Jin began. From the border marches, the army split into multiple divisions. Genghis himself advanced in the direction of the Jin capital Zhongdu, with his general Jebe in the vanguard, beginning the Yehuling Campaign.

By 1211, Genghis Khan had begun campaigns against the Jin dynasty, defeating their armies and gaining access to the capital Zhongdu (modern Beijing). Internal Jin conflicts and desertions weakened their defenses. Temporary negotiations in 1214 gave the Jin a brief reprieve, but their later betrayal prompted Genghis Khan to prepare for the final conquest. Crucial for his decision to attack the Jin empire was the intelligence Genghis received from the Jin themselves, notably from the Khitan Ila Ahai, who, impressed by Genghis at their first meeting, offered his services and commanded Khitan troops at Zhongdu, later being generously rewarded after the city’s fall.

== Siege ==
Genghis Khan’s army advanced into northern China and approached the Huan-erh-tsui pass, which led toward Beijing. Jin forces, led by the commander Zhi-zhong, attempted negotiations, sending an officer, Ming-an, who defected and revealed the Jin positions. Skirmishes allowed the Mongols to capture several major cities and fortresses around Beijing, isolating the capital.

Beijing was heavily fortified, with four fortress-villages outside the walls, each containing 4,000 soldiers, granaries, and arsenals. The city walls were almost 15 m thick at the base, with a crenellated parapet 12 m high, 13 gates, and over 900 watchtowers. While Zhongdu resisted direct assault, Mongol armies continued to achieve success in the surrounding countryside, gradually tightening their blockade of the capital.

Ming ’an, the Khitan defector, distinguished himself at the storming of Zhongdu and was given command of Mongol and Han troops. Ja’far also played a critical role, conducting peace negotiations with the besieged city in 1214, for which Genghis later rewarded him with a darughachi of lands between the Yellow River and the Iron Gate.

The siege lasted nearly a year, with the Mongols suffering an epidemic and the city’s inhabitants facing starvation. Leadership inside Beijing collapsed: the civilian commander’s deputy committed suicide, while the military commander escaped with his relatives to Kaifeng. The situation in the city became so desperate that inhabitants were reportedly reduced to cannibalism. The Mongols employed systematic encirclement and blockade tactics, cutting supply lines and preventing relief of the city.

In June 1215, the remaining defenders of Zhongdu, left without hope and receiving no relief from the relocated Jin court, surrendered and opened the gates to the Mongol forces.

After the surrender, the city was plundered, thousands were massacred, and fires destroyed large parts of the urban area. Some sources report that women and girls threw themselves from the walls to avoid capture.

Special units were formed from loyal tribesmen after the siege: To’oril commanded a unit of Chaghan-ko’a’s descendants, Onggur oversaw a regiment of dispersed Baya’uts, and 2,000 Ikires formed their own unit under Botu-guregen, Genghis’ son-in-law. Juzjani notes: ‘When a few years later Baha ad-Din, leader of a mission from Sultan Muhammad of Khwarazm, approached the capital he saw a white hill and in answer to his query was told that it consisted of the bones of the massacred inhabitants.

== Aftermath ==
During the course of the invasion several Jin generals switched sides, reflecting growing disillusionment with the Jin leadership and its inability to counter the Mongols effectively. Following the fall of Zhongdu, other provinces of the Jin Empire began to rebel, accelerating the dynasty’s political fragmentation. The conquest of Jin territory also led to the incorporation of Han Chinese troops into the Mongol military system. Former Jin units were reorganized along Mongol lines and later became known as the “Black Army” (Hei Chiin), playing an important role in subsequent campaigns. Genghis Khan did not pursue the role of Chin emperor, instead leaving Mukali as supreme commander in China, appointing darughachi in towns, and returning to Mongolia to address threats at home. Plunder and gifts taken from Zhongdu helped solidify Mongol unity and loyalty among tribes, officers, and ordinary soldiers.
