= Yehuling Campaign =

Decisive engagement in the Mongol conquest of the Jin dynasty

Coordinates: 41.1037°N 114.717°E

- Traditional Chinese: 野狐嶺戰役
- Simplified Chinese: 野狐岭战役
Transcriptions
Standard Mandarin
- Hanyu Pinyin: Yěhúlǐng Zhànyì

The Battle of Yehuling, including the Battle of Huihe River, the Battles at Wild Fox Ridge, and the Battle of Badger Mouth, was fought between the Mongol Empire and the Jin dynasty in 1211, during the first stage of the Mongol conquest of the Jin dynasty. The battle took place in the northwest of present-day Wanquan District, Zhangjiakou, Hebei Province. It concluded with a Mongol victory, hastening the decline of the Jin dynasty.

Battle of Yehuling
- Part of the Mongol conquest of the Jin dynasty
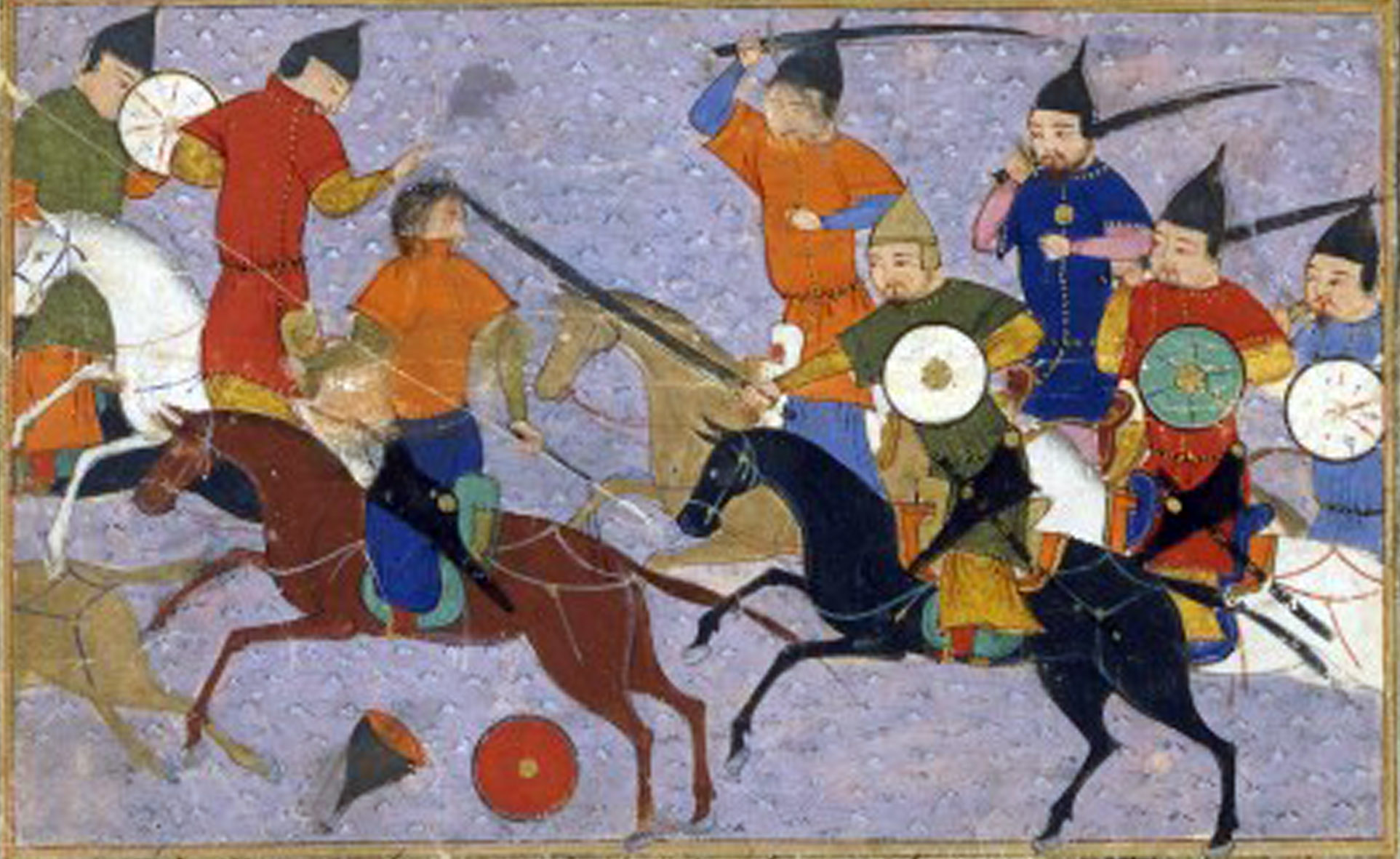
- An illustration of the Battle of Yehuling, from Jami' al-tawarikh by Rashid-al-Din Hamadani
Date	August – October 1211
Location	North China, Jin dynasty
Result	Mongol victory

Belligerents
Mongol Empire	Jin dynasty

Commanders and leaders
Genghis Khan; Muqali; Jebe; Ögedei; Subutai	Wanyan Yongji; Wanyan Chengyu; Zhuhu Gaoqi; Hushahu; Wanyan Jiujin †; Tushan Yi; Shimo Ming'an (surrendered)

Strength
65,000, with 10,000 Onggud auxiliaries	600,000+, including 500,000 infantry and 120,000 cavalry

Casualties and losses
Light	Devastating

== Background ==
By 1206, the Mongol (Note: At this point in time, the word "Mongols" only referred to the members of one tribe in northeast Mongolia; because this tribe played a central role in the formation of the Mongol Empire, their name was later used for all the tribes.) chieftain Temüjin had subdued all rivals on the Mongolian plateau. At a kurultai (assembly) in that year, he formally adopted a new title—Genghis Khan—as the ruler of a new nation, the nascent Mongol Empire. His first military operations took place against the Western Xia dynasty: in 1209–1210, the Mongol army defeated several Xia armies and besieged the capital Zhongxing (present-day Yinchuan) before securing the submission of the Xia and a large tribute. However, this was a prelude aimed at securing his southern border before attacking his real target, the Jin dynasty in North China.

The Jin dynasty had for decades carried out a policy of divide and rule in the Mongolian steppe. In the mid-12th century, they allied with the Tatar tribes and cruelly executed Ambaghai, then the Mongol khan. Thereafter, they regularly sent troops into the steppe to enslave or punish the nomads. In the 1190s, the Jin allied with Temüjin's Mongols against the Tatars and granted him power and titles—in exchange for his paying tribute as a vassal. After 1206, however, Genghis had no intention of remaining a notional subject of the Mongols' old enemy. He had other reasons for declaring war too, such as: taking revenge for Ambaghai's murder; hatred of Wanyan Yongji, the Jin emperor, who had previously insulted him; and the obvious goal of pillaging the riches of Jin territory.

Although his army was outnumbered by approximately ten-to-one (the historian Paul Ratchnevsky estimated the Mongol army in 1211 at 65,000 soldiers with 10,000 allies, while the Jin had 500,000 infantry and 120,000 cavalry) Genghis opened hostilities in 1210 by refusing to pay tribute. Importantly, he had secured the loyalty of the juyin—tribal groups such as the Onggud in Inner Mongolia—who had previously served as steppe guards for the Jin, but who now controlled the strategic border marches on the Mongol Empire's behalf. He also had gathered extensive intelligence from Jin defectors and merchants such as Ja'far Khwaja.

=== Prelude ===
The aim of the 1211–1212 campaign was not to conquer territory, but as a chevauchée to plunder, gather information, and diminish Jin control in North China, before returning to Mongolia. The Mongol army was marshalled on the Kerulen River in spring 1211, and leaving behind a division of 20,000 men under Toquchar to prevent uprisings in the Mongol heartland from recently-subdued tribes, they marched forth to the juyin borderlands, which Genghis used as an operational headquarters. The border terms of Dashuibo and Fengli (Chinese: 豐利, in present-day Taipusi Banner) were taken in spring in what Christopher Atwood terms "a precautionary feeler". Following the capture of Dashuibo, the alarmed Jin emperor tried to begin peace negotiations, but his overtures were rebuffed.

From the border marches, the army split into multiple divisions. The right (western) wing under Genghis's eldest sons Jochi, Chagatai, and Ögedei marched to the western domains of the Jin, in central Inner Mongolia and Shanxi, a strategically and economically important area around modern Hohhot. Here they pillaged and prevented Jin reinforcements from travelling north. On the left (eastern) wing, a small detachment scouted in the area of Linhuangfu prefecture (Chinese: 臨潢府, in present-day Baarin Left Banner). Genghis himself advanced in the direction of the Jin capital Zhongdu, with his general Jebe in the vanguard.

== Campaign ==
The primary sources of the Mongol conquest of the Jin dynasty—namely the Secret History of the Mongols, the Shengwu qinzheng lu, the Jami' al-tawarikh of Rashid al-Din, numerous chapters of the Yuan shi, and other minor chronicles—are very often inaccurate and contradictory. Difficulties faced by the chroniclers included the odd seasonality of the Mongol invasions, which usually happened over winter and thus overlapped with two years of the Chinese calendar, and the desire to simplify the repetitive, gruelling, and intricate military campaigns. Thus, in the sources, the Yehuling Campaign appears as a continuous Mongol advance—however, Atwood's analysis of the sources has produced a logistically and geographically coherent timeline.

The Jin chancellor, Duji Sizhong (獨吉思忠), led the bulk of the Jin army to the northwestern frontline. The Jin could not match the numbers of Mongol horsemen, and had only 30,000–50,000 troops. The Khan himself led the main Mongol army to attack Wusha Fortress (烏沙堡) and capture Wuyue Camp (烏月營), thus destroying the Jin army's defence lines.

=== Battle of Yehuling and Huan'erzui ===
Wanyan Chengyu (完顏承裕), who succeeded Duji Sizhong as chancellor, was put in charge of the Jin army. He ordered his men to abandon the three cities of Hengzhou (恆州; in present-day Zhenglan Banner, Inner Mongolia, Changzhou (昌州; north of present-day Jiuliancheng Town, Guyuan County, Hebei), Fuzhou (撫州; present-day Zhangbei County, Hebei), and move towards Yehuling. His aim was to make use of the mountainous terrain in Yehuling to obstruct the Mongol cavalry.

Mountainous terrain was a challenge for the Mongolian cavalry. However it was also a difficult area to fight in for the bigger Jin forces. The vast Jin forces were scattered among the mountains and the valley choke points. The difficult terrain and far distances made communication and coordination of troops difficult. This would prove fatal for the Jin forces, when the Mongols executed a focused and concentrated attack.

The Jin imperial court sent Shimo Ming'an (石抹明安), an official of Khitan descent, to meet Genghis Khan and start peace negotiations. However, Genghis Khan managed to induce Shimo Ming'an to surrender and defect to his side. Shimo Ming'an even provided the Mongols with military intelligence about the Jin army.

Genghis Khan sent his general Muqali to lead the Balu Unit (八魯營) to launch a surprise cavalry charge on the enemy via a passage at Huan'erzui (獾兒嘴; lit. "Badger Mouth"). Before the battle, Muqali promised Genghis Khan, "I will not return alive if I do not defeat the Jin army!" The Mongol army's morale surged. Because of the mountainous terrain, the Mongols were unable to deploy their superior cavalry to its full advantage, hence they dismounted and fought on foot. High on morale, the Mongols defeated the central Jin forces and fought their way towards Wanyan Chengyu's main camp. Due to poor communications, the Jin forces on the sides were not able to reinforce the central Jin positions.

Eventually, the Jin army became disorganized, lost its morale, and started to break. The Jin army's field commander, Wanyan Jiujin (完顏九斤), was killed in action. With the collapse of the central Jin forces, the other Jin forces nearby soon routed and a massacre followed. The entire Jin army was destroyed, leaving dead corpses for over a hundred miles. This battle took place in August 1211.

=== Battle of Huihe Fortress ===
Wanyan Chengyu managed to rally the scattered Jin forces after the Battle of Huan'erzui and Yehuling and gather at Huihe Fortress (澮河堡). However, they soon came under attack by pursuing Mongol forces around October 1211. The Mongols swiftly surrounded the Jin forces and engaged them in fierce battle for three days. Genghis Khan then personally led 3,000 horsemen on a cavalry charge towards the enemy while the remaining Mongol forces followed behind. The entire Jin army was destroyed while Wanyan Chengyu barely escaped alive. Wanyan Chengyu was replaced by Tushan Yi (徒單鎰) as chancellor.

== Aftermath ==
After the battle, Emperor Xingsheng of the Jin was assassinated in the central capital, Zhongdu (中都; present-day Beijing), by one of his generals, Hushahu (胡沙虎), who then took control of the city. During the siege, the residents of Zhongdu were forced to resort to cannibalism to survive, before they finally decided to surrender.

Roughly ten Jin cities were plundered by the Mongols. While the Jin dynasty managed to retain power for the next two decades or so, its core was severely weakened. In spite of the defeat, the Jin dynasty prioritised conquering the Southern Song dynasty in southern China over defending its borders against future Mongol incursions and invasions. This led to increasing enmity between the Southern Song dynasty and the Jin dynasty. Eventually, the Southern Song dynasty allied with the Mongols against the Jin dynasty and destroyed the latter in 1234.
