= Hushahu =

Jurchen general (fl. 1208–1213)

Hushahu (Chinese: 胡沙虎, fl. 1208 – c. 28 November 1213), courtesy name Zhizhong, was a general of the Jurchen Jin dynasty who is known for his actions during the Mongol invasions.

Hushahu, a noble of the Jurchen people, served with distinction against the Southern Song and was rewarded with command of the strategic city of Xijing (present-day Datong). However, he performed poorly against the invading Mongols under Genghis Khan in 1211, first abandoning his men and later losing the decisive Battle of Huanrzui (the "Badger's Mouth") in February 1212. In 1213, amidst the ongoing war against the Mongols, the ambitious Hushahu left his station and travelled to the Jin capital at Zhongdu, where he assassinated the reigning emperor Wanyan Yongji. Although another emperor was soon crowned, Hushahu retained de facto power and attempted to fight on against the Mongols, but he in turn was assassinated by a subordinate on 28 November.

== Biography ==
Hushahu was a noble of the Jurchen people from the Heshilie clan; the name "Hushahu" was originally Jurchen, transliterated into Chinese. He had performed well during the recent war against the Southern Song, and as a reward was given command of the frontier army at the western Jin capital of Xijing (present-day Datong) in 1208. As the viceroy (liušu) and Xijing, Hushahu controlled the two bandit-suppression commissions (čeu-tau-ši) at Huanzhou and Fengzhou, the latter near modern Hohhot. Known together as the Sigin (Xijing) route, these two commissions supervised the Jin defence of Inner Mongolia, a strategic region which housed part of the imperial Jin stud and, importantly, guarded the routes east to the Jin capital at Zhongdu.

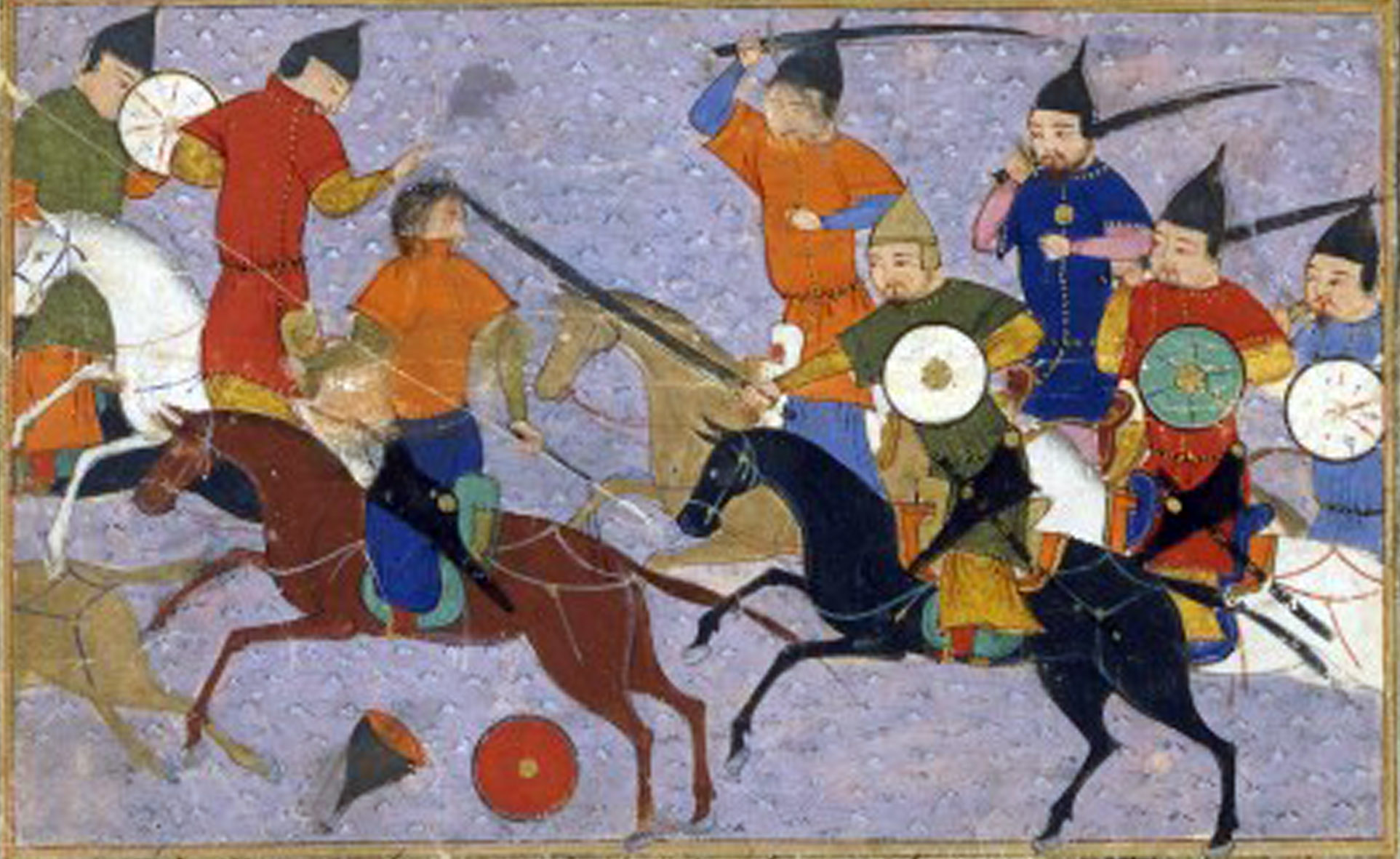
Mongol and Jin cavalry fighting during the Yehuling Campaign

In 1211, the nascent Mongol Empire under Genghis Khan began their invasions of the Jin to seek plunder and revenge for past slights. In the Yehuling Campaign, they defeated the defending Jin armies at the Battle of Huihe River on 26 September 1211 and then spread out over the northern Jin provinces, taking many cities as they went. When fighting the Mongols near present-day Shijiazhuang, Hushahu abandoned his men and fled to Zhongdu. Reports that he fled from a siege of Xijing are likely later exaggerations intended to emphasise his fault for the decline of the Jin.

In early 1212, as the Mongols were retreating north with their plunder, the Jin emperor Wanyan Yongji ordered Hushahu to pursue them with a reinforcement army. Contemporary reports gave massive estimates for the size of his army—over 400,000 or 500,000 troops—but these numbers were likely deliberately inflated to scare the Mongols into retreating. In the event, Hushahu's army was comprehensively defeated at the Battle of Huanrzui (the "Badger's Mouth") in February, and the exaggerated numbers made the Mongols seem legendary. Hushahu escaped the calamitous defeat and the subsequent Mongol pursuit, fleeing with one hundred soldiers back to Zhongdu. There, he attempted to persuade Wanyan Yongji to withdraw the remaining garrisons in the northern provinces, who he thought could not withstand the Mongol forces. His advice was ignored and he was dismissed from court; the Mongols also ignored the cities of Xuandezhou and Huailai and returned to the Mongolian plateau.

In autumn 1213, Hushahu left his post at Xijing, allowing the Mongols to break through a strategic pass and defeat a Jin army, whose general accused Hushahu of treachery before being killed in retribution. Ignoring the Mongols, Hushahu—who had always been ambitious—travelled to Zhongdu, intending to overthrow the emperor. Knowing that his abandonment of Xijing would lead to harsh punishment and disgrace, Hushahu engineered a conspiracy in August or September which assassinated both the city governor and Wanyan Yongji, whose nephew Wanyan Xun was crowned Emperor Xuanzong on Hushahu's orders.

Nevertheless, Hushahu retained de facto power in Zhongdu, and was acclaimed by his new puppet ruler. By November 1213, the Mongols had won a decisive victory at Jinshan and then captured the strategic Juyong Pass, which allowed access to Zhongdu. On 14 November, Hushahu declared martial law in the city, and although very unwell, he initially supervised skirmishes against the approaching division of 5,000 Mongol warriors, but soon fell out with Marshal Geuki and attempted to execute him. Geuki survived because of his past deeds, but when he was decisively defeated by Mongol incendiary catapults, he declined to simply return to his death. Instead, on 28 November, his troops surrounded Hushahu's house and killed him when he tried to flee. Geuki formed part of the new administration, which began considering peace terms on 17 December, and finally signed a short-lived treaty on 30 April 1214.
