= Haolai River =

River in China

The Haolai River (耗来河) is a narrow river located on the Inner Mongolia Plateau in northern China, referred to as the "narrowest river in the world" by some sources. It stretches approximately 17 kilometres (11 mi) in length. Its average width is 15 centimetres (5.9 in). The river is 4 centimetres (1.6 in) wide at its narrowest point.

== See also ==
- List of rivers of China
- Dalai Nur
