= Zhongdu =

Capital of the Jin dynasty (1153–1214)

Zhongdu (Chinese: 中都; lit. 'Middle Capital'), also called Daxing City (Chinese: 大興城), was a capital city of the Jurchen-led Jin dynasty (1115–1234) of China, located in modern-day Beijing, in the southwestern part of Xicheng District. It served as the Jin capital from 1153 to 1214.

== History ==
By the late 12th century the city had a population of nearly one million, and was the last and largest city built in that location prior to the Yuan dynasty.

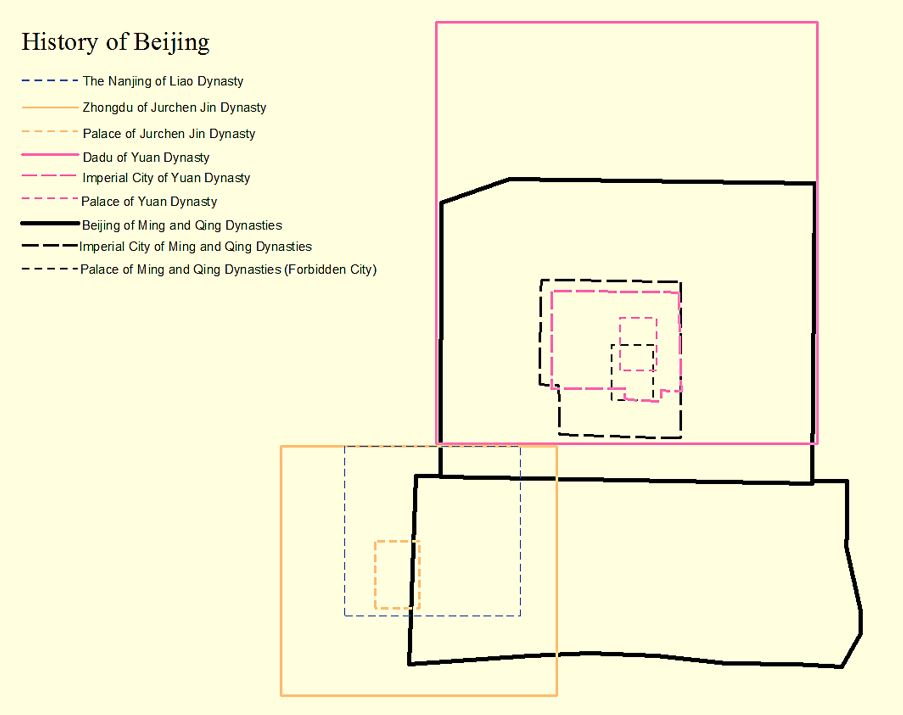
Map showing the evolution of the walls of Beijing from the Liao to the Qing dynasties (916–1912)

The Mongol Empire laid siege to Zhongdu twice during its conquest of the Jin dynasty, eventually destroying it in 1215. In 1213 the Mongols sized the nearby Juyong Pass and defeated Marshall Shuhu Gaoqi. The city had already been destabilised by Hushahu's power grab, the murder of Wanyan Yongji of Jin, the naming of his nephew Wanyan Xun as emperor, and the murder of the Zhongdu city governor. After their campaign throughout Northern China, Genghis Khan met with his troops near Zhongdu in March 31, 1214. The Mongol forces laid siege to the city requesting an important ransom and a princess of the imperial family - terms the Jin agreed to on April 30th. Shortly after, the Jin court moved to Kaifeng while South Khitan and Tatar auxiliaries deserted to the Mongol. The crown prince Shouzhong was left as regent in Zhongdu, although he escaped to Nanjing shortly after. Genghis Khan interpreted this as a betrayal of their agreement and decided to lay siege to Zhongdu again. Aforementioned Khitan and Tatar troops led by Shimo Ming'an (石抹明安) started laying siege in July. Inhabitants resorted to canibalism to avoid surrendering, with the siege eventually ending on May 31, 1215 with Grand councillor Wanyan Fuxing poisoning himself and Mongols entering the city.

After the Yuan dynasty was established, Kublai Khan ordered the construction of the Yuan capital Dadu (Khanbaliq) to the northeast of Zhongdu.

Among the various capital cities situated on the site of modern-day Beijing, including the Liao dynasty's Nanjing, the Jin dynasty's Zhongdu, the Yuan dynasty's Dadu, and the Ming and Qing dynasties' Beijing, Zhongdu was the second smallest, measuring around 3 to 4 miles across.

== See also ==
- History of Beijing
- Nanjing (Liao dynasty)
- Dadu
- Shangdu
