= Mongolian Plateau =

Part of the Central Asian Plateau

Coordinates: 45°N 110°E

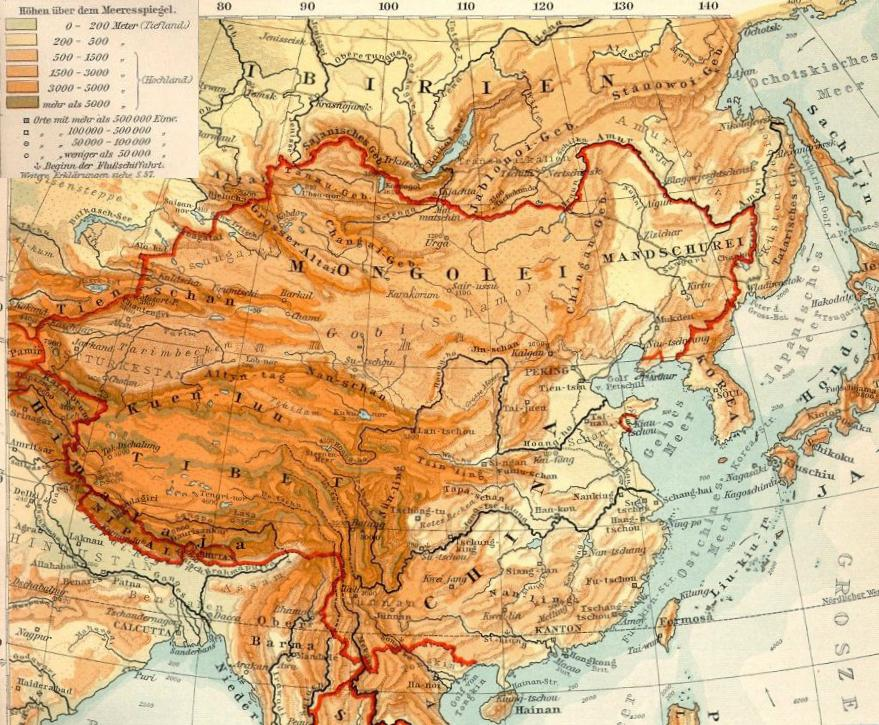
- 1903 topographic map of the Qing dynasty depicting the Mongolian Plateau

Chinese name
- Traditional Chinese: 蒙古高原
- Simplified Chinese: 蒙古高原
Transcriptions
Standard Mandarin
- Hanyu Pinyin: Ménggǔ Gāoyuán
- Bopomofo: ㄇㄥˊ ㄍㄨˇ ㄍㄠ ㄩㄢˊ

Mongolian name
- Mongolian Cyrillic: Монголын тэгш өндөрлөг
- Mongolian script: ᠮᠣᠩᠭᠣᠯ ᠤᠨ ᠲᠡᠭᠰᠢ ᠥᠨᠳᠥᠷᠯᠢᠭ

The Mongolian Plateau or Altai Plateau is an inland plateau in East Asia covering approximately 3,200,000 square kilometers (1,200,000 mi^{2}). It is bounded by the Greater Hinggan Mountains in the east, the Yin Mountains to the south, the Altai Mountains to the west, and the Sayan and Khentii mountains to the north. The plateau includes the Gobi Desert as well as dry steppe regions. It has an elevation of roughly 1,000 to 1,500 meters (3,300 to 4,900 ft), with the lowest point in Hulunbuir and the highest point in the Altai.

Politically, the plateau spans all of Mongolia, along with parts of China and Russia. Inner Mongolia and parts of the Dzungarian Basin in Xinjiang encompass the Chinese portion of the plateau. In Russia, the plateau forms Transbaikal, part of Buryatia, and the southern Irkutsk Oblast. The Mongolian Plateau comprises the majority of the area known as the Mongol heartland.

== Geography ==
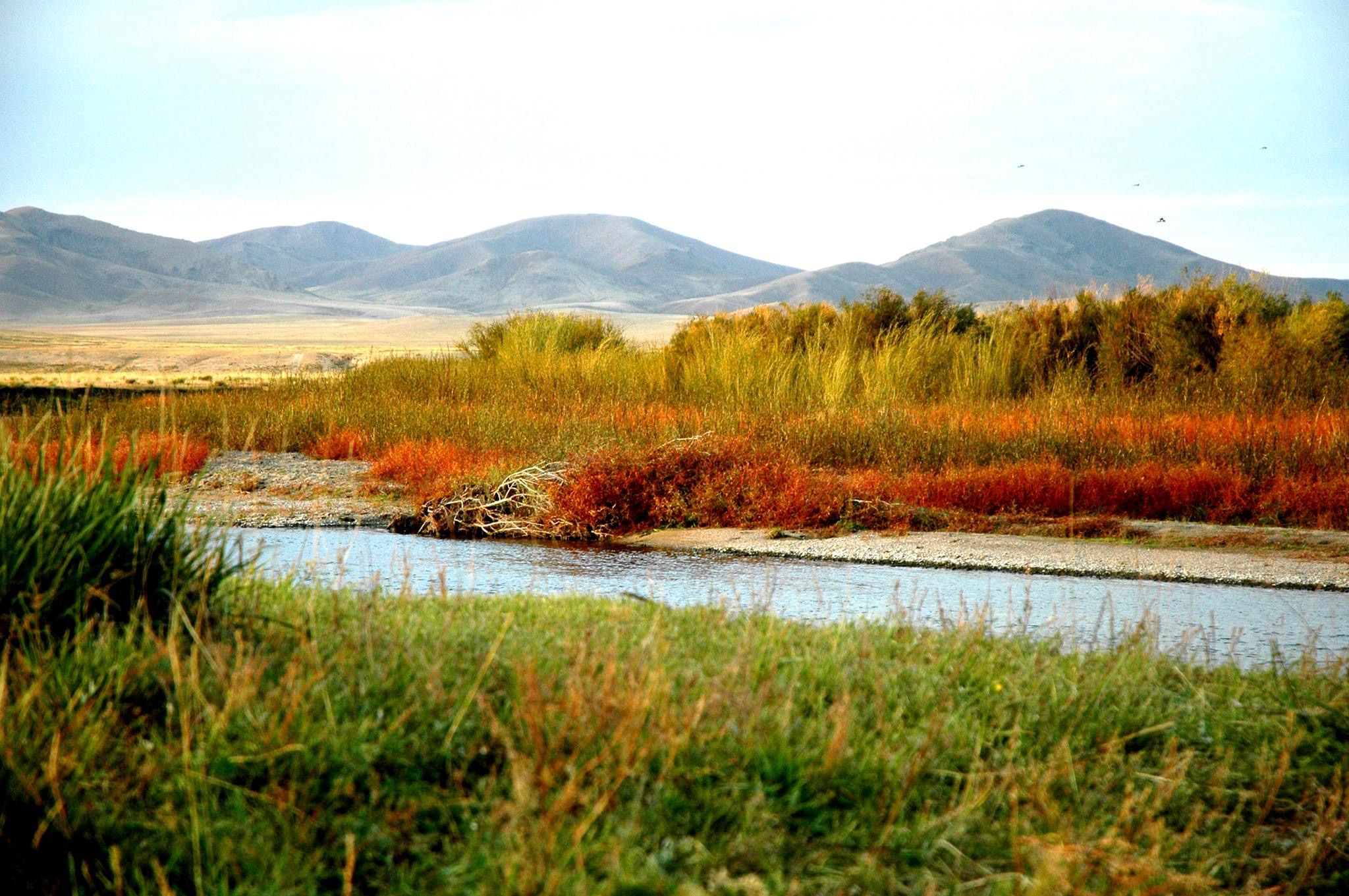
River in the Mongolian Plateau, northern Mongolia

The average elevation of the Mongolian Plateau ranges from 915 to 1,525 meters (3,002 to 5,003 ft) above sea level. The highest point in the plateau is found in Tavan Bogd at 4,374 meters (14,350 ft) above sea level.

== Ecology ==
The ecology of Mongolia is complex, having varying regions of highland and lowland areas. Grazing species such as yaks, Przewalski's horses, domesticated sheep, saiga antelope, Siberian ibex and Argali are common. Predator species include the Eurasian lynx, snow leopards, Corsac foxes as well as carnivorous birds such as the bearded vulture, saker falcon, and the cinereous vulture. Marmots are common throughout the region including the Tarbagan marmot with large parts of its range located in the Mongolian plateau.

== History ==
The plateau was inhabited and conquered by various groups, including (chronologically) the Xiongnu, Xianbei, Göktürks, Tang dynasty, Liao dynasty, Mongol Empire, Yuan dynasty, Northern Yuan dynasty, and Qing dynasty.

== Environmental changes ==
Between 1980 and 2010, rising global temperatures and direct human activity (particularly the use of lake water for mining and agriculture) have contributed to a significant loss of lake surface area across the Plateau. Qagaan Nurr and XinKai Lake have shrunk by two-thirds of their surface area during that time, while others (including Huangqihai Lake and Naiman Xihu) have dried up entirely. Some exceptions, such as East Juyan Lake and Had Paozi, have grown, but overall the average total surface area of lakes in the region has shrunk by 30%. The region also suffers from a high rate of desertification.

== See also ==
- Lop Nur
- South Siberian Mountains
- Taklamakan Desert
- Tarim Basin
- Haolai River
