= Golden Horde =

1242–1502 Turkicized Mongol khanate

Golden Horde اولوغ اولوس Ulug Ulus
- c. 1225–1502
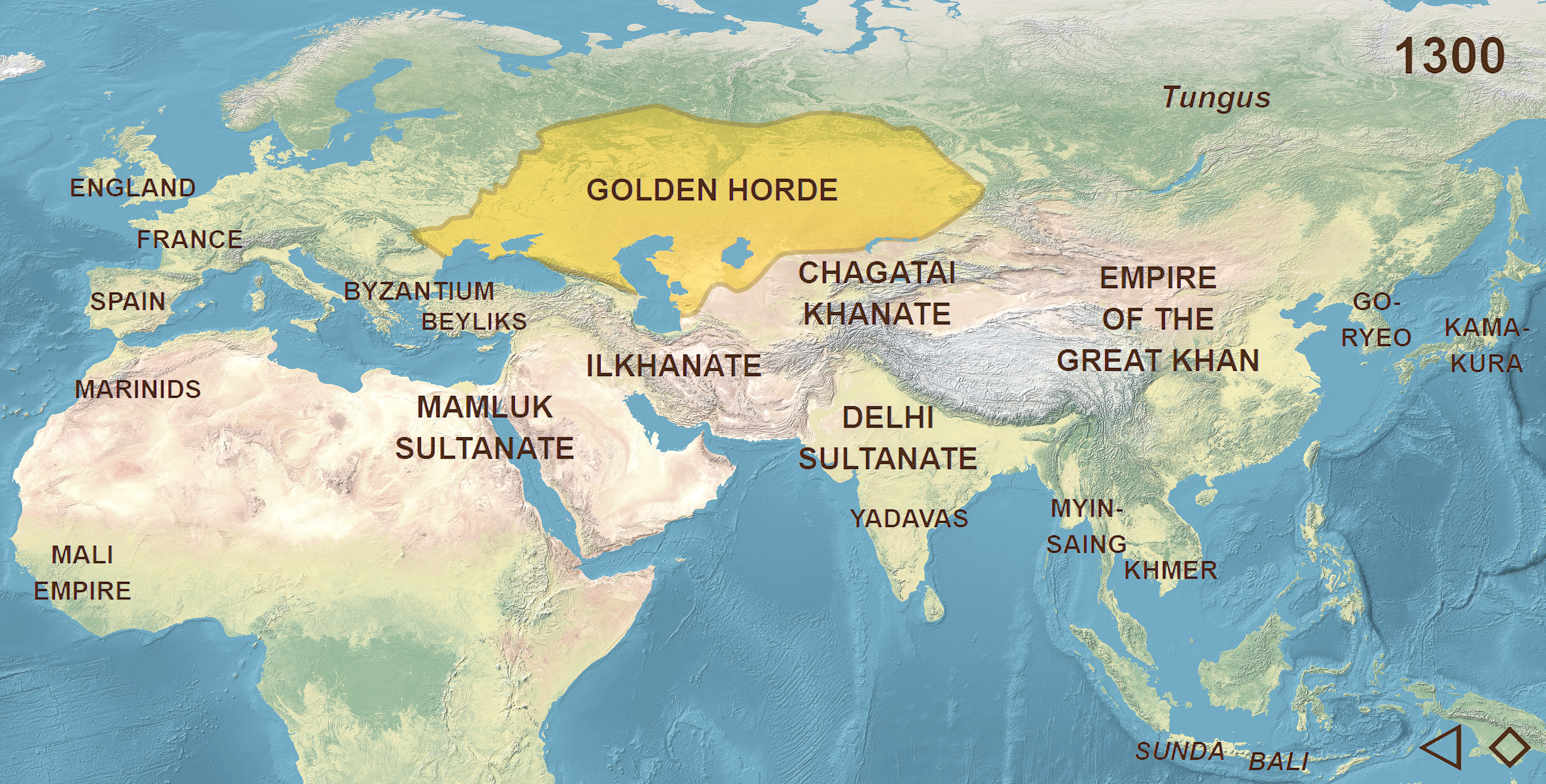
- Territories of the Golden Horde in 1300
- Status: Nomadic empire
- Capital: Sarai (Western wing, later overall); Sighnaq (Eastern wing)
- Common languages: Middle Mongol, (Note: Official language since the inception of the Golden Horde, used in chancery.) Kipchak Turkic (Note: Especially the western Kipchak dialects, this language spoken by the majority of the inhabitants of the Black Sea steppe who were non-Mongol Turks, and those in the Khan's army. Shift from Mongol to Turkic occurred in the 1350s, or earlier, also used in chancery.)
- Religion: Tengrism; Shamanism; Nestorianism; Tibetan Buddhism (1240s–1313); Islam (1313–1502)
- Government: Semi-elective monarchy, later hereditary monarchy
- Khan
  - c. 1225 (first): Jochi
  - 1226–1280: Orda Khan (Blue Horde)
  - 1242–1255: Batu Khan (White Horde)
  - 1379–1395: Tokhtamysh
  - 1459–1465: Mahmud bin Küchük (Great Horde)
  - 1481–1502 (last): Sheikh Ahmed
- Historical era: Late Middle Ages
  - Established: c. 1225
  - Blue Horde and White Horde united: 1379
  - Disintegrated into Great Horde: 1466
  - Great Stand on the Ugra River: 1480
  - Sack of Sarai by the Crimean Khanate: 1502

Area
- 1310: 6,000,000 km^{2} (2,300,000 sq mi)
- Currency: Pul, som, dirham
Preceded by
Mongol Empire
Succeeded by
Great Horde
Astrakhan Khanate
Crimean Khanate
Kazakh Khanate
Khanate of Kazan
Nogai Horde
Uzbek Khanate
Khanate of Sibir
Qasim Khanate

The Golden Horde, or Ulus of Jochi, (Note: Their state came to be known in historiography as the Golden Horde or the ulus ("people" or "patrimony") of Djochi, while the contemporaries simply referred to it as the Great Horde (ulu orda).) self-designated as Ulug Ulus (lit. 'Great State' in Turkic), was originally a Mongol and later Turkicized khanate established in the 13th century, originating from the northwestern part of the Mongol Empire. After the division of the empire in 1259, it became a functionally independent khanate. It is also known as the Kipchak Khanate, and replaced the earlier, less organized Cuman–Kipchak confederation.

It originally consisted of the lands bequeathed to Jochi (d. 1225). It grew greatly in size under Batu Khan, the founder of the Blue Horde. After Batu's death in 1255, his dynasty flourished for a full century, until 1359, though the intrigues of Nogai instigated a partial civil war in the late 1290s. The Horde's military power peaked during the reign of Özbeg Khan (1312–1341), who adopted Islam. The territory of the Golden Horde at its peak extended from Siberia and Central Asia to parts of Eastern Europe from the Urals to the Danube in the west, and from the Black Sea to the Caspian Sea in the south, while bordering the Caucasus Mountains and the territories of the Mongol dynasty known as the Ilkhanate.

The khanate experienced a period of great political instability known as the Great Troubles (1359–1381), before it briefly reunited under Tokhtamysh (1381–1395). However, soon after the 1396 invasion of Timur, the founder of the Timurid Empire, the Golden Horde broke into smaller khanates which declined steadily in power.

By the start of the 15th century, the Horde had begun to fall apart. By 1466, it was being referred to simply as the "Great Horde". Within its territories there emerged numerous predominantly Turkic khanates. These internal struggles allowed Moscow to formally rid itself of the "Tatar yoke" at the Great Stand on the Ugra River in 1480, which traditionally marks the end of Mongol rule over Russia. The Crimean Khanate and the Kazakh Khanate, the last remnants of the Golden Horde, survived until 1783 and 1847 respectively, when they were conquered by the expanding Russian state.

== Name ==
The self-designation of the state was Ulugh Ulus or Ulugh Orda (lit. 'Great State'). As the state disintegrated, the definition of the term was narrowed to the rump state that existed in the Volga region known as the Great Horde. After its final disintegration in 1502, the name was adopted by the Crimean Khanate, which considered itself the heir to the Golden Horde.

The name Golden Horde is a partial calque of the Russian term Zolotaya Orda (Золотая Орда), which is itself supposedly a partial calque of the Turkic term Altan Orda (lit. 'Golden Camp' or 'Golden Horde'). In this process, Zolotaya was translated as "Golden", while Orda was transliterated as "Horde". The appellation Golden is said to have been inspired by either the golden color of the tents the Mongols lived in during wartime, by an actual golden tent used by Batu Khan or Özbeg Khan, or by the riches of the khan. The color gold also denoted imperial status, while other colors referred to directions.

The Russians used the term Orda, derived from the word ordo, which the Mongols used to refer to a mobile camp, to denote the seat of the khan. Depending on the time period, the Volga–Ural region has been referred to by various names, including Orda ("Horde"), Zolotaya Orda ("Golden Horde") and Bolshaya Orda ("Great Horde"), in addition to "Jochid Ulus", named after Jochi. The English word horde, in the sense of a large (and often threatening) group, emerged later, metaphorically extended from the reputation of the Mongol hordes.

It was not until the 16th century that Russian chroniclers begin explicitly using the term Zolotaya Orda to refer to this particular successor khanate of the Mongol Empire. The first known use of this term, in 1565, in a Russian chronicle called the History of Kazan, applied it to the ulus of Batu, centered on Sarai. In the earliest Russian chronicles that mention the Golden Horde, the state had no official name; instead, various expressions were used, such as "Tatars". In contemporary Persian, Armenian and Muslim writings, and in the records of the 13th and early 14th centuries such as the Yuanshi and the Jami' al-tawarikh, the khanate was called the Ulus of Jochi ('realm of Jochi' in Mongolian), Dasht-i-Qipchaq (Persian: دشت قپچاق, 'Qipchaq Steppe') or Khanate of the Qipchaq, and Comania or Cumania. Modern historians use the names Golden Horde and Qipchaq or Kipchak Khanate.

The eastern or left wing (or "left hand" in official Mongol-sponsored Persian sources) was referred to as the Blue Horde in Russian chronicles and as the White Horde in Timurid sources (e.g. Zafar-Nameh). Western scholars have tended to follow the Timurid sources' nomenclature and refer to the left wing as the White Horde. However, Ötemish Hajji (fl. 1550), a historian of Khwarazm, referred to the left wing as the Blue Horde, and since he was familiar with the oral traditions of the khanate, it seems likely that the Russian chroniclers were correct, and that the khanate itself referred to its left wing as the Blue Horde. The khanate apparently used the term White Horde to refer to its right wing, which was situated in Batu's home base in Sarai and controlled the ulus. The designations Golden Horde, Blue Horde, and White Horde have not been encountered in the sources of the Mongol period.

== Mongol origins (c. 1225 – 1241) ==
Genghis Khan divided the Mongol Empire amongst his four sons as appanages. Jochi (d. 1225) was given the lands (an ulus) around the Irtysh River. As the eldest son, he was given the lands that were farthest away from his father's native land, according to the Mongol custom. However, the territory was not fixed and Jochi died before he could significantly expand it. Batu Khan was designated as his primary heir. Jochi's eldest son Orda founded a separate power in the east (the eastern wing). Both agreed they could not claim each other's territories and that Batu's descendants had precedence over Orda's descendants.

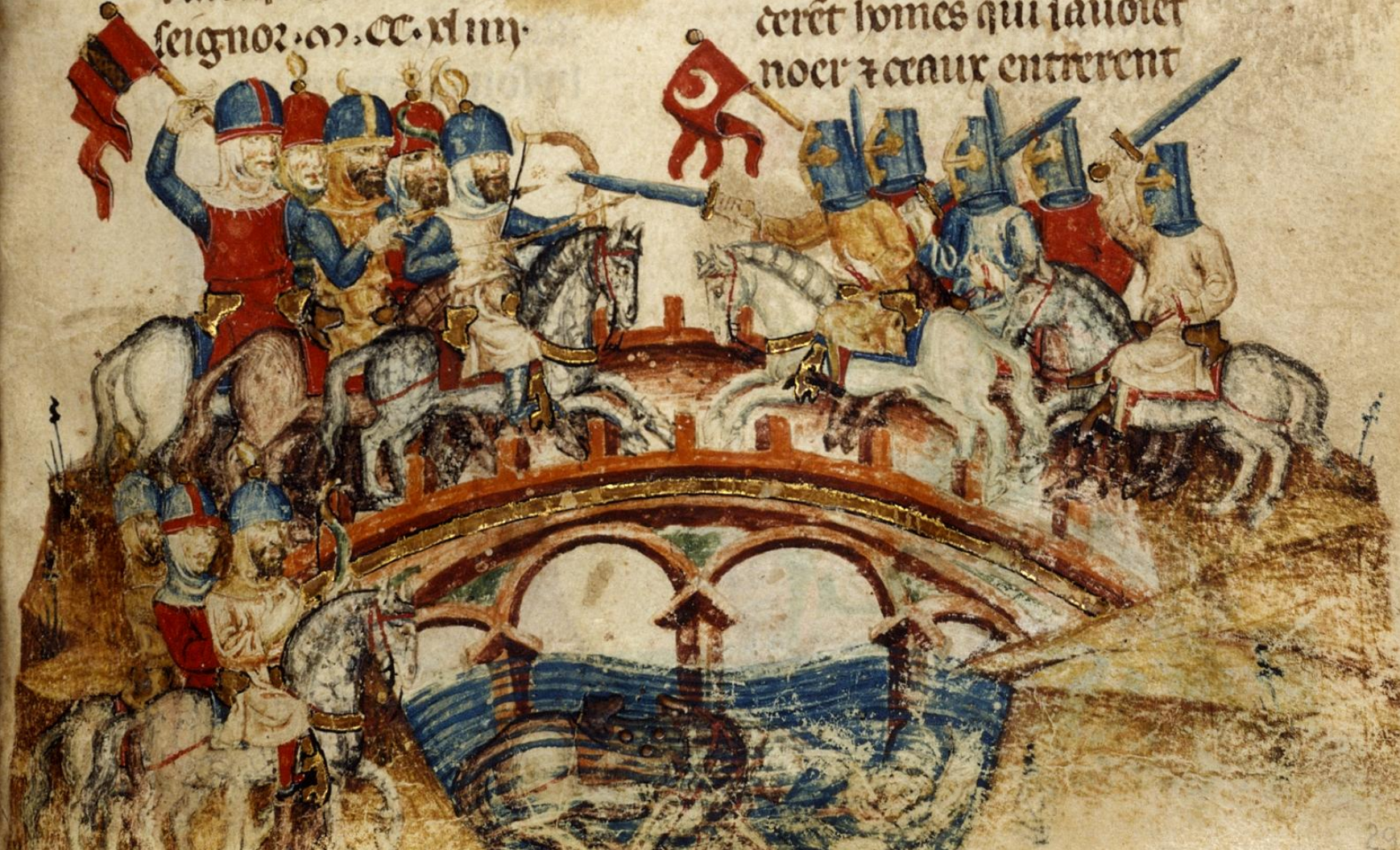
Decisive Golden Horde victory in the Battle of Mohi

In 1229, at Ögödei's enthronement, the kurultai decided to subdue the Kipchaks and Batu was tasked with military operations in the west, having won Ögödei's favor. In 1235, Batu with the great general Subutai began an invasion westwards, first conquering the Bashkirs' land and then moving on to Volga Bulgaria in 1236. From there, they went on to conquer the Russian principalities, the first to fall being Ryazan in December 1237. The Mongols abandoned their plan to capture Novgorod due to muddy terrain and local resistance. As a result of scorched earth tactics, the Mongols were forced to move southward in the direction of the Dnieper. In the winter of 1240–1241, Kiev was sacked. Batu and Subutai crossed the Dnieper and advanced towards Hungary in March 1241. In the spring of 1241, German, Polish and Hungarian forces were defeated by the Mongols at Legnica and Mohi. In January or February 1242, the Mongols crossed the Danube and advanced into Austria and Dalmatia while pursuing Béla IV of Hungary. However, in March, they halted their advance after learning of Ögödei's death in December 1241. Subutai then ordered all his forces to withdraw. On their way back through Hungary, the Mongols destroyed Pest before proceeding to subjugate Bulgaria.

Relations between Batu and Subutai became increasingly strained. Subutai returned to the Mongol capital Karakorum, while Batu returned to his new residence in the Kipchak Steppe. Batu resented the authority of the Ögödeids and never returned to Mongolia, instead opting to consolidate his horde. It was Orda, not Batu, who led the Jochid delegation to Karakorum and participated in the inauguration of Güyük as the new great khan. Following Güyük's election, both brothers abandoned their claim to the title. Batu's new residence in the lower Volga was strategically located, since the area served as a crossroads for both land and water routes. In addition, its distance from the Dnieper, where the Lithuanians frequently raided, and the Caucasus, where rebellious Alans and Circassians hid in the mountains, made it a safe location. The growing population and increasing number of tents was the result of both trade and the growing pastoral economy.

While the Mongolian language was undoubtedly in general use at the court of Batu, few Mongol texts written in the territory of the Golden Horde have survived, perhaps because of the prevalent general illiteracy. According to Grigor'ev, the yarliq, or decrees of the khans, were written in Mongol, then translated into the Cuman language. The existence of Arabic–Mongol and Persian–Mongol dictionaries dating from the middle of the 14th century and prepared for the use of the Egyptian Mamluk Sultanate suggests that there was a practical need for such works in the chancelleries handling correspondence with the Golden Horde. It is thus reasonable to conclude that letters received by the Mamluks – if not also written by them – must have been in Mongol.

== Golden Age ==
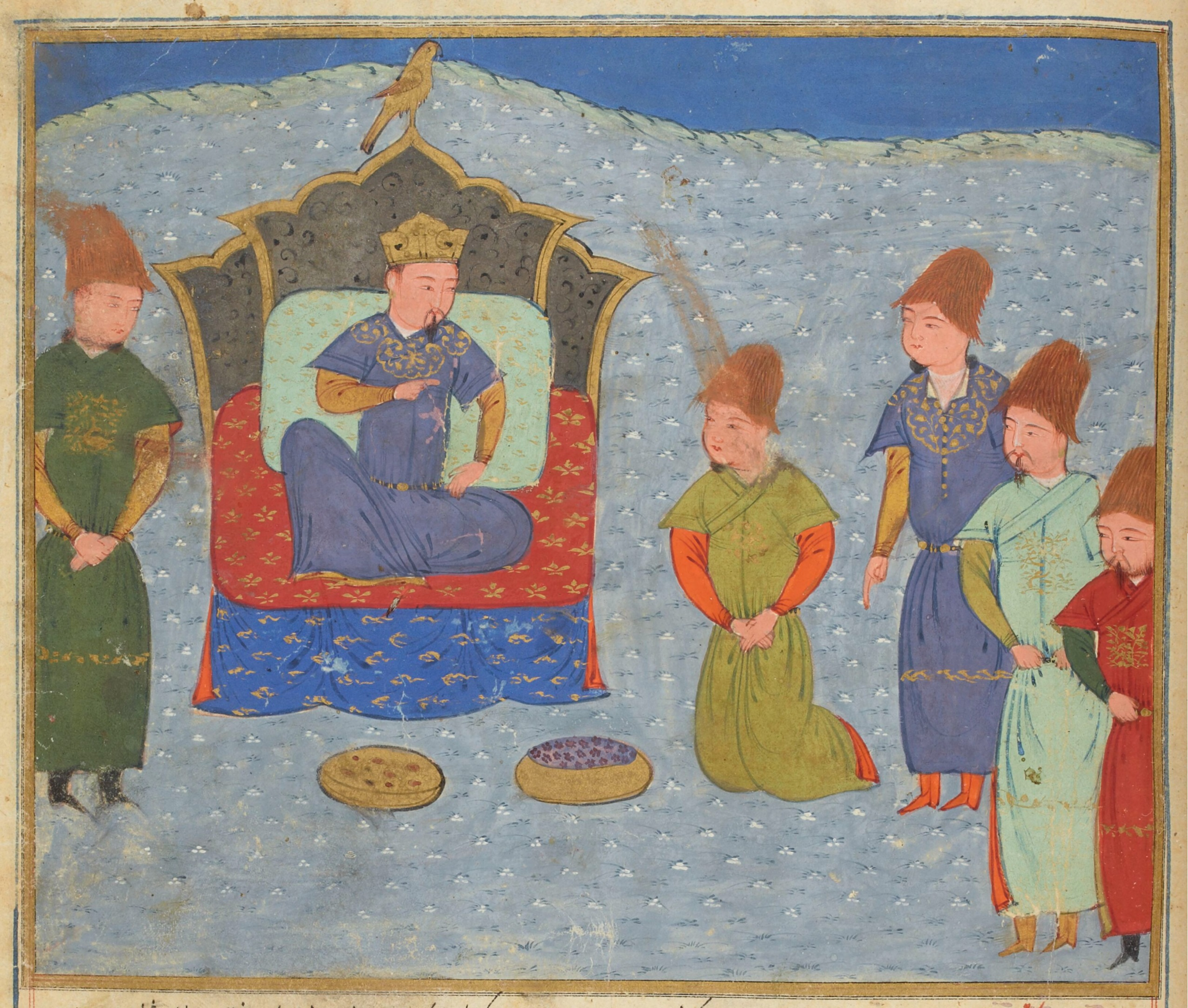
Batu Khan establishes the Golden Horde.

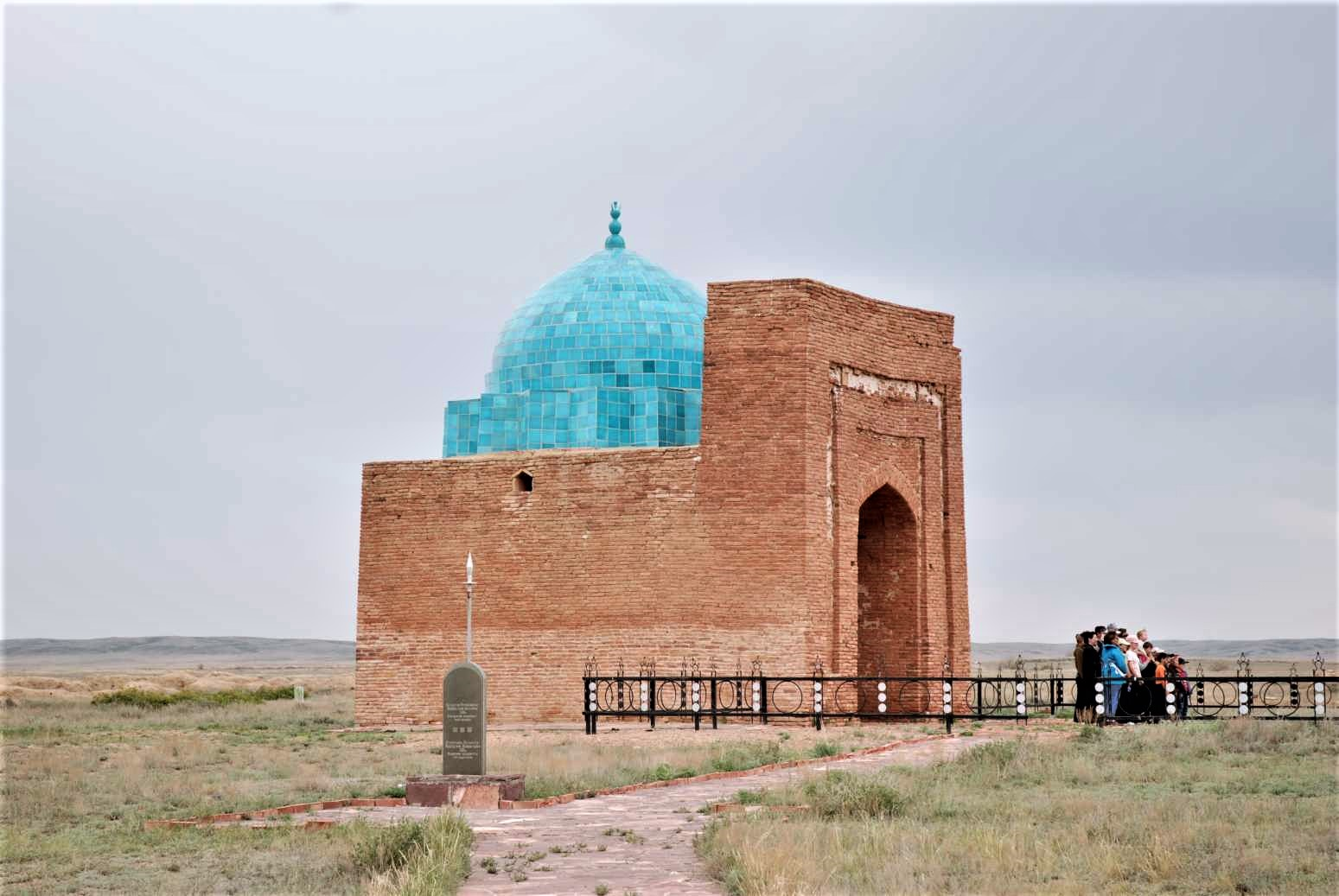
Jochi Mausoleum, Ulytau Region, Kazakhstan

=== Batu Khan (1242–1256) ===
When the Great Khatun Töregene invited Batu to elect the next Emperor of the Mongol Empire in 1242, he declined to attend the kurultai and instead stayed at the Volga River. Although Batu excused himself by saying he was suffering from old age and illness, it seems that he did not support the election of Güyük Khan. Güyük and Büri, a grandson of Chagatai Khan, had quarreled violently with Batu at a victory banquet during the Mongol occupation of Eastern Europe. He sent his brothers to the kurultai, and the new Khagan of the Mongols was elected in 1246. The Mongols did not conduct any significant military operations in the northwest during Batu's rule, allowing him to develop the system of administration.

All the senior princes of Rus', including Yaroslav II of Vladimir, Daniel of Galicia, and Sviatoslav III of Vladimir, acknowledged Batu's supremacy. Originally Batu ordered Daniel to turn the administration of Galicia over to the Mongols, but Daniel personally visited Batu in 1245 and pledged allegiance to him. After returning from his trip, Daniel was visibly influenced by the Mongols, and equipped his army in the Mongol fashion, his horsemen with Mongol-style cuirasses, and their mounts armoured with shoulder, chest, and head pieces. Michael of Chernigov, who had killed a Mongol envoy in 1240, refused to show obeisance and was executed in 1246.

When Güyük called Batu to pay him homage several times, Batu sent Yaroslav II, Andrey and Alexander Nevsky to Karakorum in Mongolia in 1247. Yaroslav never returned and died in Mongolia. He was probably poisoned by Töregene Khatun, who probably did it to spite Batu and even her own son Güyük, because he did not approve of her regency. At a council in Vladimir, it was decided that Yaroslav's brother Sviatoslav would become grand prince; however, Sviatoslav never went to the khan for confirmation, which caused Mikhail Khorobrit to expel his brother from Vladimir and claim the throne; however, he died in 1248 during a battle with the Lithuanians. Güyük appointed Andrey as the grand prince of Vladimir and Alexander was given the princely title of Kiev. However, when they returned, Andrey went to Vladimir while Alexander went to Novgorod instead. A bishop by the name of Cyril went to Kiev and found it so devastated that he abandoned the place and went further east instead. The princes of Vladimir-Suzdal ultimately became responsible for delivering the Russian tribute to the khan.

In 1248, Güyük demanded Batu come east to meet him, a move that some contemporaries regarded as a pretext for Batu's arrest. In compliance with the order, Batu approached, bringing a large army. When Güyük moved westwards, Tolui's widow and a sister of Batu's stepmother Sorghaghtani warned Batu that the Jochids might be his target. Güyük died on the way, in what is now Xinjiang, at about the age of 42. Although some modern historians believe that he died of natural causes because of deteriorating health, he may have succumbed to the combined effects of alcoholism and gout, or he may have been poisoned. William of Rubruck and a Muslim chronicler state that Batu killed the imperial envoy, and one of his brothers murdered the Great Khan Güyük, but these claims are not completely corroborated by other major sources. Güyük's widow Oghul Qaimish took over as regent, but she was unable to keep the succession within her branch of the family.

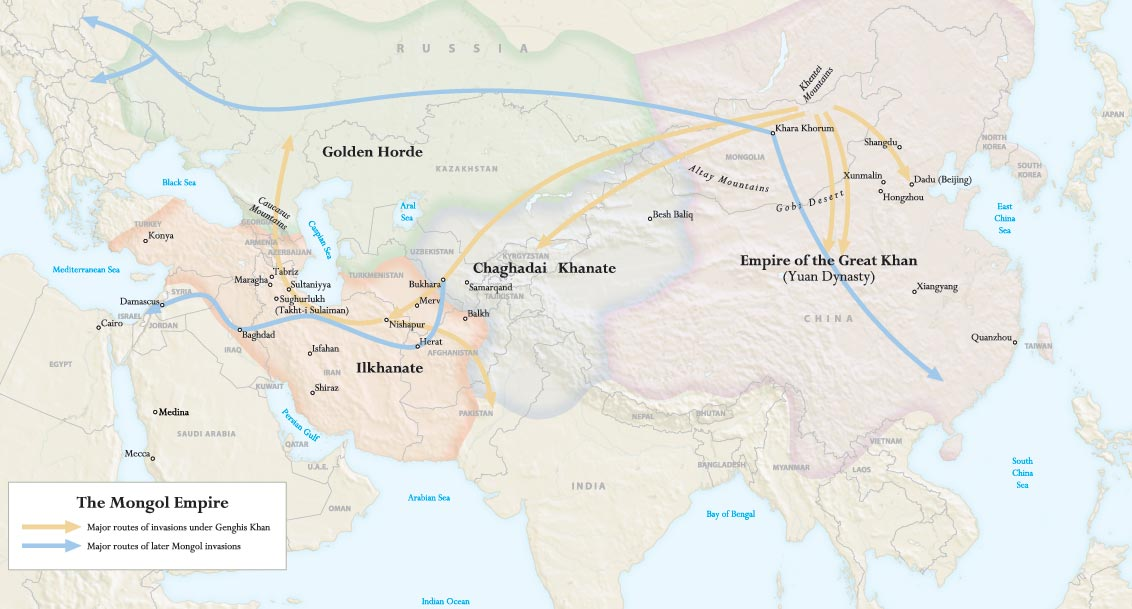
Routes taken by Mongol invaders

With the assistance of Batu, Möngke succeeded as Great Khan in 1251. Utilizing the discovery of a plot designed to remove him, Möngke as the new Great Khan began a purge of his opponents. Estimates of the deaths of aristocrats, officials, and Mongol commanders range from 77 to 300. Batu became the most influential person in the Mongol Empire as his friendship with Möngke ensured the unity of the realm. Batu, Möngke, and other princely lines shared rule over the area from Afghanistan to Turkey. Batu allowed Möngke's census-takers to operate freely in his realm. Local censuses took place in the 1240s, including the areas of Russia and Turkey. In 1251–1259, Möngke conducted the first empire-wide census of the Mongol Empire. North China was completed in 1252, and in 1257, Möngke appointed a chief darughachi for the Volga region with the assistance of counters, known as chislenitsi in Russian sources. They were able to cover Crimea, the Caucasus, the Kipchak steppe, and possibly up to southern Siberia. The Novgorod region in the far northwest was not counted until the winter of 1258–1259. There was an uprising in Novgorod against the Mongol census, but Alexander Nevsky mediated between the Mongols and the city, after which the nobles oversaw tax collection directly.

Möngke now had direct control over the Rurikid princes. However, Andrey II refused to submit to Batu. Batu sent a punitive expedition under Nevruy, who defeated Andrey and forced him to flee to Novgorod, then Pskov, and finally to Sweden. The Mongols overran Vladimir and harshly punished the principality. The Livonian Knights stopped their advance to Novgorod and Pskov. Thanks to his friendship with Sartaq Khan, Batu's son, who was a Christian, Alexander was installed as the grand prince of Vladimir by Batu in 1252.

=== Berke (1257–1266) ===
Banner adopted sometime during 1267–1280, during the reign of Möngke Temür

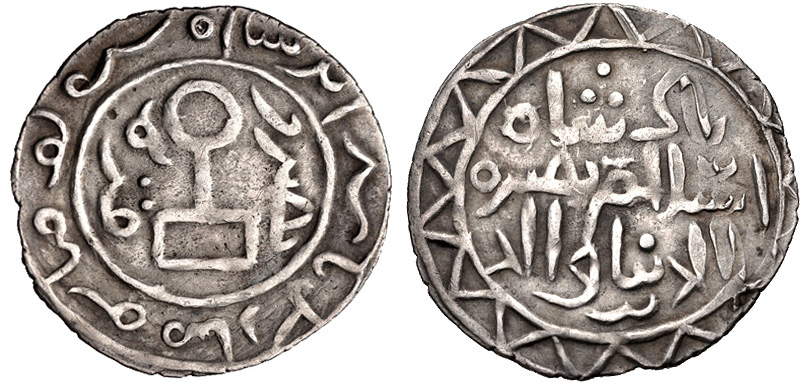
Coinage of Berke, Qrim (Crimea) mint. Struck c. AH 662–665 (AD 1263–1267).

After Batu died in 1256, his son Sartaq Khan was appointed by Möngke Khan. As soon as he returned from the court of the Great Khan in Mongolia, Sartaq died. The infant Ulaghchi succeeded him under the regency of Boragchin Khatun, Batu's widow. The khatun summoned the Rurikid princes to Sarai to renew their patents. In 1256, Andrey traveled to Sarai to ask for pardon. He was once again reappointed as the grand prince of Vladimir. Ulaghchi soon died after a few months and, according to Arabic sources, Boragchin turned to Hulegu for protection. Batu's younger brother, Berke, accused Boragchin of high treason and had her executed. Berke, who had been converted to Islam, was enthroned as khan of the Golden Horde in 1257 or 1258.

In 1256, Daniel of Galicia openly defied the Mongols and ousted their troops in northern Podolia. In 1257, he repelled Mongol assaults led by the prince Kuremsa on Ponyzia and Volhynia and dispatched an expedition with the aim of taking Kiev. Despite initial successes, in 1259 a Mongol force under Boroldai entered Galicia and Volhynia and offered an ultimatum: Daniel was to destroy his fortifications or Boroldai would assault the towns. Daniel complied and pulled down the city walls. In 1259 Berke launched savage attacks on Lithuania and Poland, and demanded the submission of Béla IV, the Hungarian monarch, and the French king Louis IX in 1259 and 1260. His assault on Prussia in 1259–1260 inflicted heavy losses on the Teutonic Order. The Lithuanians were probably tributary in the 1260s, when reports reached the Curia that they were in league with the Mongols.

In 1261, Berke approved the establishment of a church in Sarai. After the death of Alexander Nevsky in 1263, the Novgorodians negotiated with the grand prince for the right to organize tax collection themselves – a proposal the Mongols accepted, provided that the payments continued. From the 1260s, local nobles began collecting taxes on behalf of the Mongols. To keep Russian nobles on their side, the Mongols allowed them to keep their lands. Berke also moved towards Islamic ruling practices and therefore might have applied the dhimmi system, in which a special tax was applied to non-Muslims.

==== Toluid Civil War (1260–1264) ====
After Möngke Khan died in 1259, the Toluid Civil War broke out between Kublai Khan and Ariq Böke. While Hulagu Khan of the Ilkhanate supported Kublai, Berke sided with Ariq Böke. There is evidence that Berke minted coins in Ariq Böke's name, but he remained militarily neutral. After the defeat of Ariq Böke in 1264, he freely acceded to Kublai's enthronement. However, some elites of the White Horde joined Ariq Böke's resistance.

==== Berke–Hulagu war (1262–1266) ====
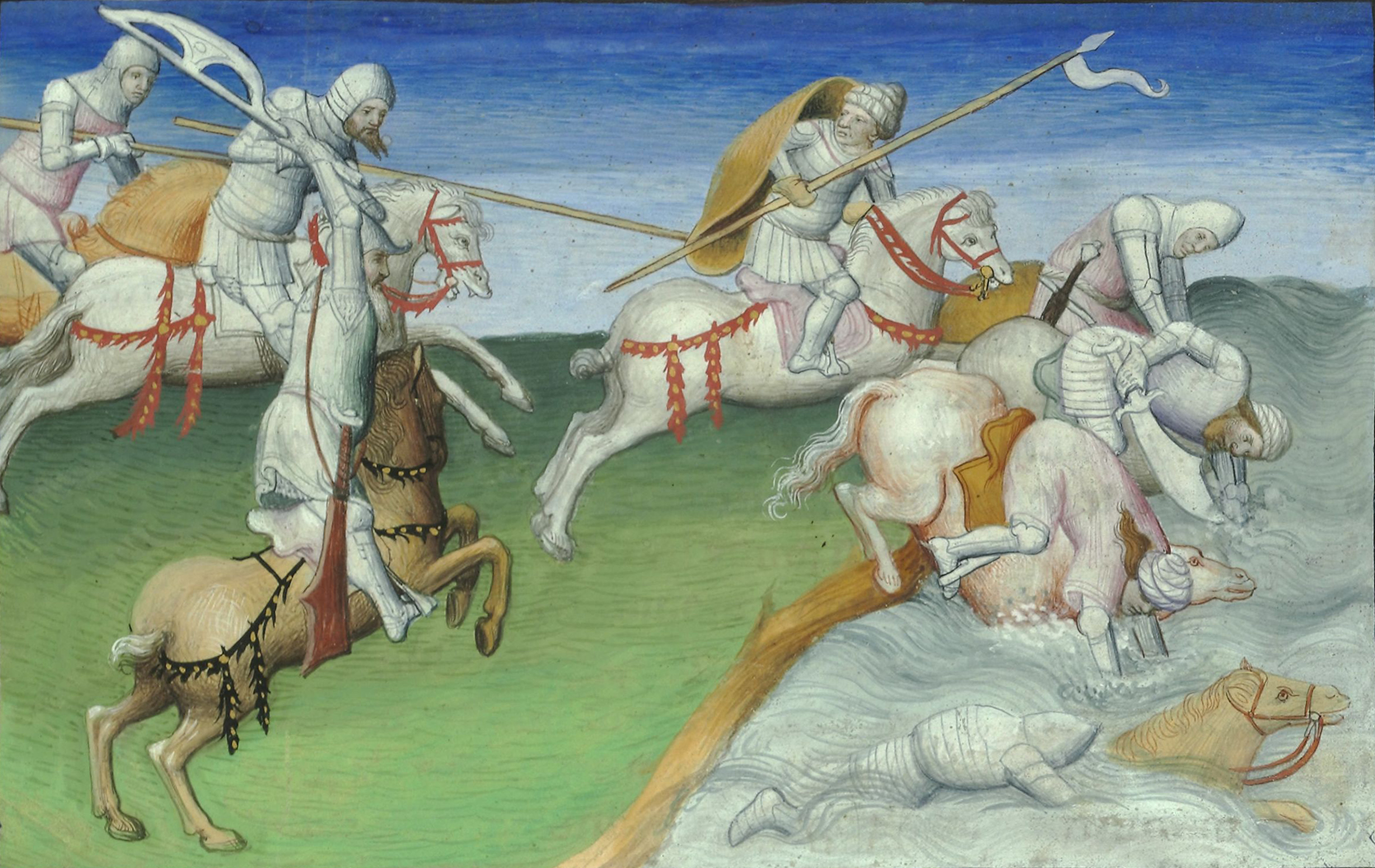
The Golden Horde army defeats the Ilkhanate at the battle of Terek in 1262. Many of Hulagu's men drowned in the Terek River while withdrawing.

Möngke ordered the Jochid and Chagatayid families to join Hulagu's expedition to Iran. Berke's persuasion might have forced his brother Batu to postpone Hulagu's operation, little suspecting that it would result in eliminating the Jochid predominance there for several years. During the reign of Batu or his first two successors, the Golden Horde dispatched a large Jochid delegation to participate in Hulagu's expedition in the Middle East in 1256–1257.

One of the Jochid princes who joined Hulagu's army was accused of witchcraft and sorcery against Hulagu. After receiving permission from Berke, Hulagu executed him. After that two more Jochid princes died suspiciously. According to some Muslim sources, Hulagu refused to share his war booty with Berke in accordance with Genghis Khan's wish. Berke was a devoted Muslim who had had a close relationship with the Abbasid Caliph Al-Musta'sim, who had been killed by Hulagu in 1258. The Jochids believed that Hulagu's state eliminated their presence in the Transcaucasus. Those events increased the anger of Berke and the war between the Golden Horde and the Ilkhanate soon broke out in 1262.

The increasing tension between Berke and Hulagu was a warning to the Golden Horde contingents in Hulagu's army to flee. One contingent reached the Kipchak steppe, another traversed Khorasan, and a third body took refuge in Mamluk ruled Syria where they were well received by Sultan Baybars (1260–1277). Hulagu harshly punished the rest of the Golden Horde army in Iran. Berke sought a joint attack with Baybars and forged an alliance with the Mamluks against Hulagu. The Golden Horde dispatched the young prince Nogai to invade the Ilkhanate but Hulagu forced him back in 1262. The Ilkhanid army then crossed the Terek River, capturing an empty Jochid encampment, only to be routed in a surprise attack by Nogai's forces. Many of them were drowned as the ice broke on the frozen Terek River. The outbreak of conflict was made more annoying to Berke by the rebellion of Suzdal at the same time, killing Mongol darughachis and tax-collectors. Berke planned a severe punitive expedition. But after Alexander Nevsky begged Berke not to punish his people, and the cities of Vladimir-Suzdal agreed to pay a large indemnity, Berke relented. Alexander died on his trip back in Gorodets on the Volga. He was well loved by the people and called the "sun of Suzdal".

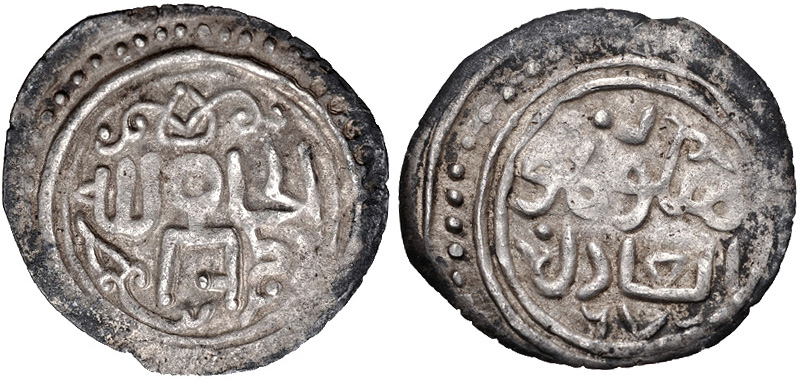
Coinage of Mengu-Timur. Bulghar mint. Dated AH 672 or 3 (AD 1273–1275).

When the former Seljuk Sultan Kaykaus II was arrested in the Byzantine Empire, his younger brother Kayqubad II appealed to Berke. An Egyptian envoy was also detained there. With the assistance of the Kingdom of Bulgaria (Berke's vassal), Nogai invaded the Empire in 1265. By the next year, the Mongol-Bulgarian army was within reach of Constantinople. Nogai forced Michael VIII Palaiologos to release Kaykaus and pay tribute to the Horde. Berke gave Kaykaus Crimea as an appanage and had him marry a Mongol woman. Hulagu died in February 1265 and Berke followed the next year while on campaign in Tiflis, causing his troops to retreat.

Ariq Böke had earlier placed Chagatai's grandson Alghu as Chagatayid Khan, ruling Central Asia. He took control of Samarkand and Bukhara. When the Muslim elites and the Jochid retainers in Bukhara declared their loyalty to Berke, Alghu smashed the Golden Horde's lands in Khorazm. Alghu insisted Hulagu attack the Golden Horde; he accused Berke of purging his family in 1252. In Bukhara, he and Hulagu slaughtered all the retainers of the Golden Horde and reduced their families into slavery, sparing only the Great Khan Kublai's men. After Berke gave his allegiance to Kublai, Alghu declared war on Berke, seizing Otrar and Khorazm. While the left bank of Khorazm would eventually be retaken, Berke had lost control over Transoxiana. In 1264 Berke marched past Tiflis to fight against Hulagu's successor Abaqa, but he died en route.

=== Mengu-Timur (1266–1280) ===
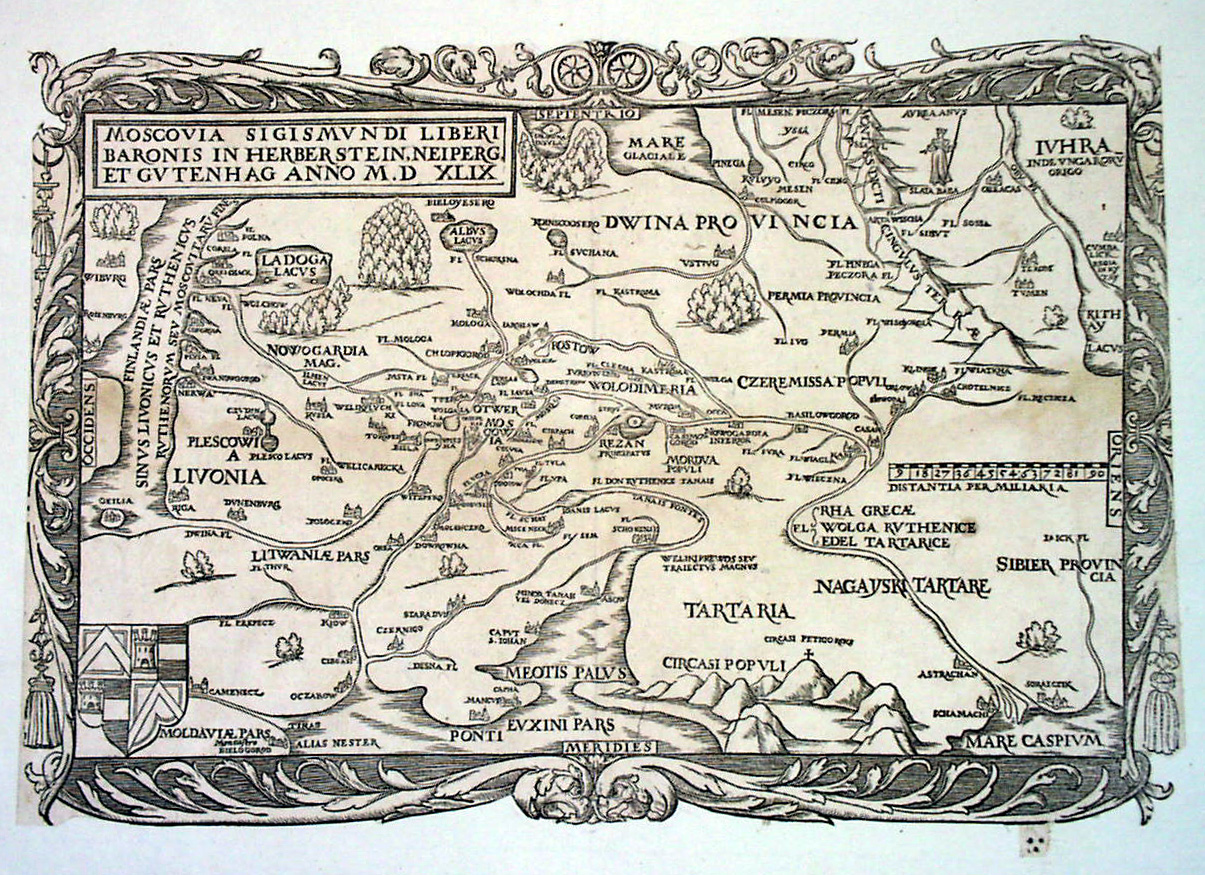
Regions in the lower Volga inhabited by the descendants of Nogai Khan

Berke left no sons, so Batu's grandson Mengu-Timur was nominated by Kublai and succeeded his uncle Berke. However, Mengu-Timur secretly supported the Ögedeid prince Kaidu against Kublai and the Ilkhanate. After the defeat of Ghiyas-ud-din Baraq, a peace treaty was concluded in 1267 granting one-third of Transoxiana to Kaidu and Mengu-Timur. In 1268, when a group of princes operating in Central Asia on Kublai's behalf mutinied and arrested two sons of the Qaghan (Great Khan), they sent them to Mengu-Timur. One of them, Nomoghan, favorite of Kublai, was located in the Crimea. Mengu-Timur might have briefly struggled with Hulagu's successor Abagha, but the Great Khan Kublai forced them to sign a peace treaty. He was allowed to take his share in Persia. Independently from the Khan, Nogai expressed his desire to ally with Baibars in 1271. Despite the fact that he was proposing a joint attack on the Ilkhanate with the Mamluks of Egypt, Mengu-Timur congratulated Abagha when Baraq was defeated by the Ilkhan in 1270.

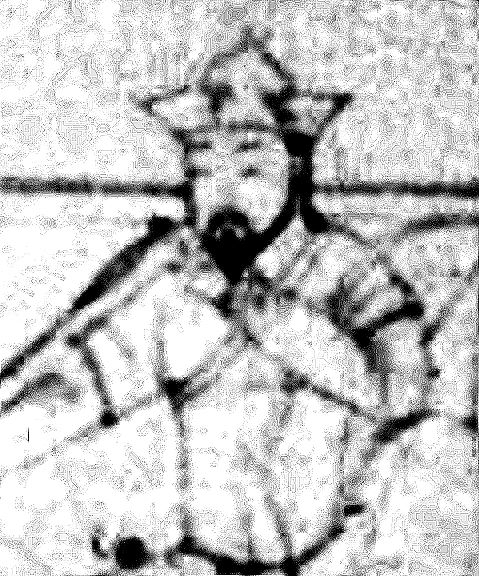
Miniature from a Timurid genealogy manuscript depicting Mengu-Timur, c. 1405–1409.

In 1267, Mengu-Timur issued a diploma (jarliq) to exempt Russian clergy from any taxation. He also gave the Genoese and Venice exclusive trading rights in Caffa and Azov. Some of Mengu-Timur's relatives converted to Christianity at the same time and settled in Russia; one of them was a prince who settled in Rostov and became known as Tsarevich Peter of the Horde (Peter Ordynsky). Mengu-Timur determined that Russian peasants would obey the nobles and religious leaders, and so he used the tarkhan system to co-opt the nobility and win their support. As a result, the Russian clergy were able to establish new landed properties. Even though Nogai invaded the Orthodox Christian Byzantine Empire in 1271, the Khan sent his envoys to maintain friendly relationship with Michael VIII Palaiologos, who sued for peace and married one of his daughters, Euphrosyne Palaiologina, to Nogai. Mengu-Timur ordered the grand prince of Vladimir to allow German merchants free travel through his lands. The gramota says:

Mengu-Timur's word to Prince Yaroslav: give the German merchants way into your lands. From Prince Yaroslav to the people of Riga, to the great and the young, and to all: your way is clear through my lands; and who comes to fight, with them I do as I know; but for the merchant the way is clear.

This decree also allowed Novgorod's merchants to travel throughout the lands of Suzdal without restraint. Mengu Timur honored his vow: when the Danes and the Livonian Knights attacked the Novgorod Republic in 1269, the Khan's great basqaq (darughachi), Amraghan, and many Mongols assisted the army assembled by the grand prince Yaroslav. The Germans and the Danes were so cowed that they sent gifts to the Mongols and abandoned the region of Narva. The Mongol Khan's authority extended to all principalities, and in 1274–1275 the census took place in all cities, including Smolensk and Vitebsk.

In 1277, Mengu-Timur launched a campaign against the Alans north of the Caucasus. Along with the Mongol army were also some of the princes who were ordered to join him in his expedition, where they took the fortified stronghold of the Alans, Dadakov, in 1278. After his Ossetian expedition, Mengu-Timur turned his attention to affairs with the Byzantine Empire and Egypt in an attempt to curb the authority of Nogai. Following the death of Constantine of Bulgaria in 1277, Michael VIII and Nogai supported different candidates to the throne, leading to relations to deteriorate. This led to an intervention by Mengu-Timur in Balkan affairs, in which Mengu-Timur and Metropolitan Kirill sent Bishop Theognost as their joint envoy to Michael VIII and the patriarch of Constantinople with their respective gifts and letters.

=== Töde Möngke (1280–1287) ===
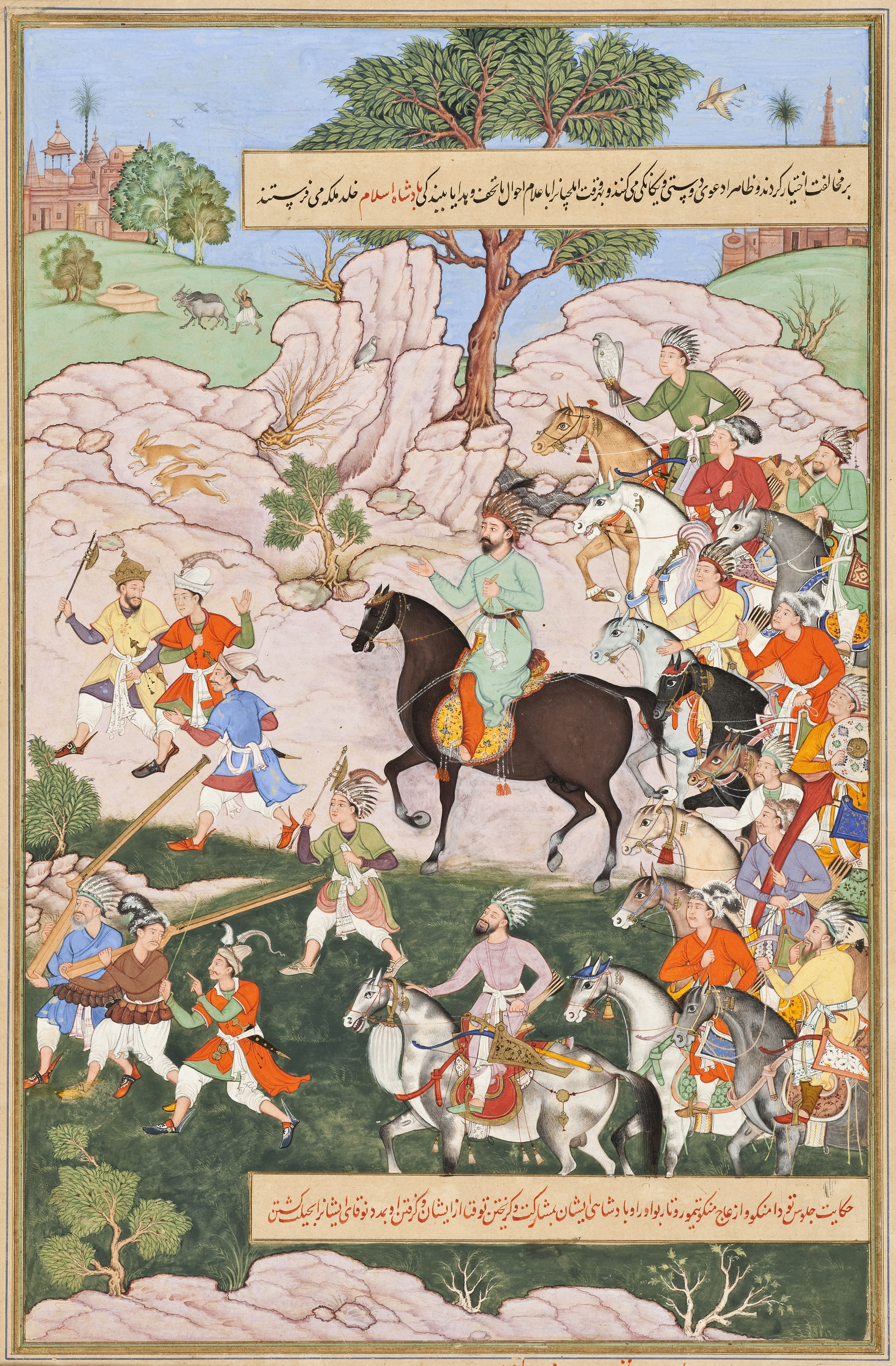
Depiction of Tode Mongke, 1596

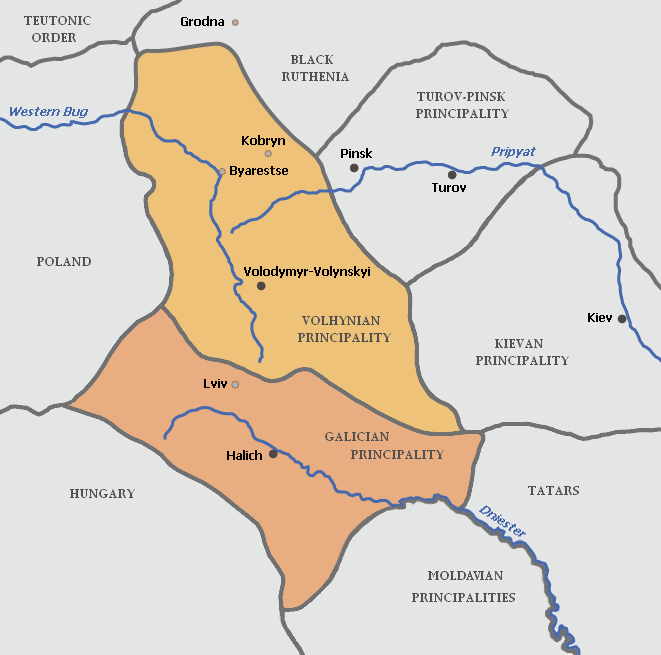
The Jochid vassal princes of Galicia-Volhynia contributed troops for invasions of Europe by Nogai Khan and Talabuga.

Mengu-Timur was succeeded in 1281 by his brother Töde Möngke, who was a Muslim. However, Nogai Khan was now strong enough to establish himself as an independent ruler. The Golden Horde was thus ruled by two khans.

Töde Möngke made peace with Kublai, returned his sons to him, and acknowledged his supremacy. Nogai and Köchü, Khan of the White Horde and son of Orda Khan, also made peace with the Yuan dynasty and the Ilkhanate. According to Mamluk historians, Töde Möngke sent the Mamluks a letter proposing to fight against their common enemy, the unbelieving Ilkhanate. This indicates that he might have had an interest in Azerbaijan and Georgia, which were both ruled by the Ilkhans.

In the 1270s, Nogai had raided Bulgaria, as well as Lithuania. He blockaded Michael Asen II inside Drăstăr in 1279 and executed the rebel emperor Ivailo in 1280. The king, George Terter I, married Nogai's daughter and acknowledged Mongol overlordship but was forced to flee by a local boyar and sought refuge in the Byzantine Empire in 1295. In 1284, Saqchi came under the Mongol rule during the major invasion of Bulgaria, and coins were struck in the Khan's name. Smilets was installed by Nogai as emperor of Bulgaria. Accordingly, the reign of Smilets has been considered the height of Mongol overlordship in Bulgaria. When he was expelled by a local boyars c. 1295, the Mongols launched another invasion to protect their protege. Nogai compelled Serbian king Stefan Milutin to accept Mongol supremacy and received his son, Stefan Dečanski, as hostage in 1287. Under his rule, the Vlachs, Slavs, Alans, and Turco-Mongols lived in modern-day Moldavia.

At the same time, the influence of Nogai greatly increased in the Golden Horde. Backed by him, some princes, such as Dmitry of Pereslavl, refused to visit the court of Töde Möngke in Sarai, while Dmitry's brother Andrey of Gorodets sought assistance from Töde Möngke. Nogai vowed to support Dmitry in his struggle for the grand princely throne. On hearing about this, Andrey renounced his claims to Vladimir and Novgorod and returned to Gorodets. He returned with Mongol troops sent by Töde Möngke and seized Vladimir from Dmitry. Dmitry retaliated with the support of Mongol troops from Nogai and retook his holdings. In 1285, Andrey again led a Mongol army under a Borjigin prince to Vladimir, but Dmitry expelled them.

In 1283, Töde Möngke converted to Islam and abandoned state affairs. Rumors spread that the khan was mentally ill and only cared for clerics and sheikhs. In 1285, Talabuga and Nogai invaded Hungary. While Nogai was partially successful in raiding Slovakia, Talabuga stalled north of the Carpathian Mountains. Talabuga was angered and sacked Galicia and Volhynia instead.

=== Talabuga (1287–1291) ===
After returning, Talabuga slew Töde Möngke, and succeeded him as the Khan of the Golden Horde. In 1287, Talabuga successfully plundered the Kingdom of Ruthenia, especially the region of Volodymyr.

In late 1287–1288, Talabuga and Nogai attacked Poland but were both defeated. Nogai's army made an unsuccessful attempt to invade the Ilkhanate in 1290.

During a bloody punitive expedition against the Circassians, Talabuga became resentful of Nogai, whom he believed did not provide him with adequate support during the invasions of Hungary and Poland. Talabuga may have been deceived into believing that Nogai was ill and on his death bed. Talabuga was ambushed and assassinated by the forces of Nogai in a coup and replaced with Toqta in 1291.

=== Toqta–Nogai conflict (1291–1299) ===
Andrey, accompanied by a number of Rostov princes and the bishop of Rostov, went to Toqta to renew his patent and complain about Dmitry. Mikhail Yaroslavich was summoned to appear before Nogai in Sarai, where he chose to side with Nogai and went to him instead for confirmation of his throne, while Dmitry refused to appear, considering himself to be a vassal of Nogai. Daniel, Alexander Nevsky's youngest son, failed to appear at the court of Toqta. The division of the authority of the Golden Horde led to the creation of two rival groups of Russian princes. Toqta attempted to reassert his authority over northern Russia; he confirmed Andrey as the grand prince and authorized him to depose Dmitry, who refused to surrender his throne. Toqta sent a punitive expedition led by his brother, Dyuden, to punish those stubborn subjects, leading to the sacking of a number of cities in 1293, including Vladimir and Moscow, finally forcing Dmitry to abdicate. Only the city of Tver offered stiff resistance to the Mongol invaders, leading to another Mongol army being sent to attack the city. Nogai did not choose to intervene in Russian affairs but was concerned by Toqta's actions; he found it necessary to remind Toqta that he still held supreme power in the affairs of the Golden Horde and consequently sent his senior wife to Toqta in 1293, where she was received with due honor. In the same year, Nogai sent an army to Serbia and forced the king to acknowledge himself as a vassal. As tensions among the Russian princes remained high, Toqta convened a congress of the princes in Pereyaslavl in 1297, at which the traditional succession principle of lestvitsa was reaffirmed.

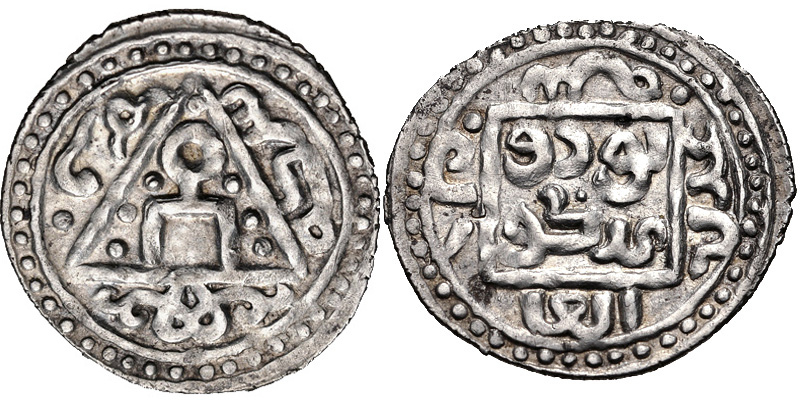
Coinage of Töde Möngke (Mengu). AH 679–687 AD 1280–1287 Qrim (Crimea) mint.

Nogai's daughter married a son of Kublai's niece, Kelmish, who was wife of a Qongirat general of the Golden Horde. Nogai was angry with Kelmish's family because her Buddhist son despised his Muslim daughter. For this reason, he demanded Toqta send Kelmish's husband to him. Nogai's independent actions relating to Russian affairs and foreign merchants had already irritated Toqta. Toqta thus refused and declared war on Nogai. Toqta was defeated in their first battle. Nogai's army turned their attention to Caffa and Soldaia, looting both cities. Within two years, Toqta returned and killed Nogai in 1299 at the Kagamlik, near the Dnieper. Toqta had his son stationed troops in Saqchi and along the Danube as far as the Iron Gate. Nogai's son Chaka of Bulgaria, first escaped to the Alans, and then Bulgaria where he briefly ruled as emperor before he was murdered by Theodore Svetoslav on the orders of Toqta.

After Mengu-Timur died, the rulers of the Golden Horde withdrew their support from Kaidu, the head of the House of Ögedei. Kaidu tried to restore his influence in the Golden Horde by sponsoring his own candidate Kobeleg against Bayan (r. 1299–1304), the khan of the White Horde. After taking military support from Toqta, Bayan asked help from the Yuan dynasty and the Ilkhanate to organize a unified attack on the Chagatai Khanate under the leadership of Kaidu and his second-in-command Duwa. However, the Yuan court was unable to send quick military support.

=== General peace (1299–1312) ===
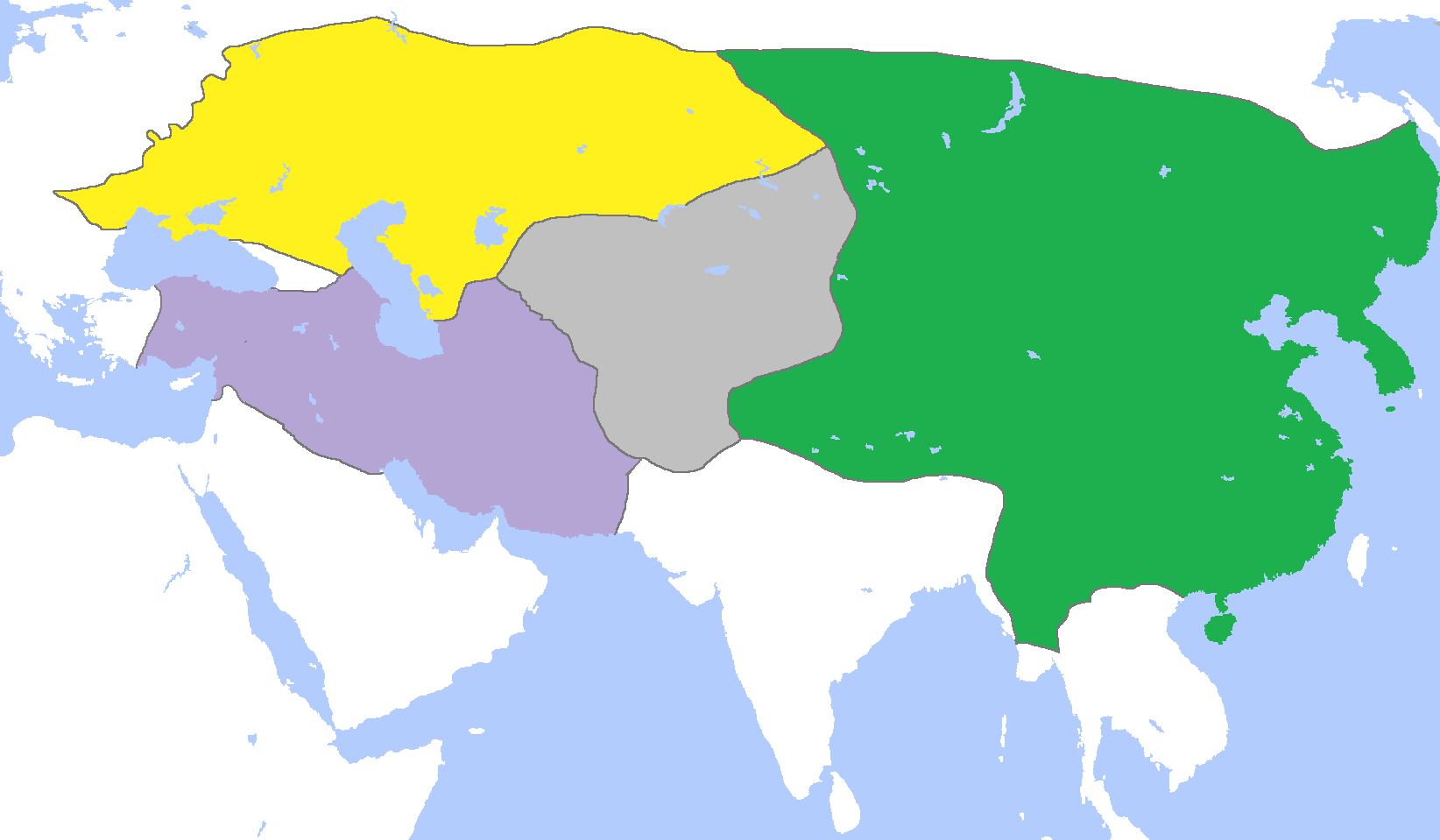
The divisions of the Mongol Empire and main Asian polities, c. 1300

From 1300 to 1302, a severe drought occurred in the areas surrounding the Black Sea. However, the troubles were soon overcome and conditions in the Golden Horde rapidly improved under Toqta's reign. After the defeat of Nogai Khan, his followers either fled to Podolia or remained under the service of Toqta, to become what would eventually be known as the Nogai Horde.

Toqta established the Byzantine–Mongol alliance by marrying Maria Palaiologina, an illegitimate daughter of Andronikos II Palaiologos. A report reached Western Europe that Toqta was highly favourable to the Christians. According to Muslim observers, however, Toqta remained an idol-worshiper (Buddhism and Tengerism) and showed favour to religious men of all faiths, though he preferred Muslims.

He demanded that the Ilkhan Ghazan and his successor Oljeitu give Azerbaijan back but was refused. Then he sought assistance from Egypt against the Ilkhanate. Toqta made his man ruler in Ghazna, but he was expelled by its people. Toqta dispatched a peace mission to the Ilkhan Gaykhatu in 1294, and peace was maintained mostly uninterrupted until 1318.

In 1304, ambassadors from the Mongol rulers of Central Asia and the Yuan dynasty announced to Toqta their general peace proposal. Toqta immediately accepted the supremacy of Yuan emperor Temür Öljeytü, and all yams (postal relays) and commercial networks across the Mongol khanates reopened. The Yuan influence seemed to have increased in the Golden Horde as some of Toqta's coins carried 'Phags-pa script in addition to Mongolian script and Persian characters.

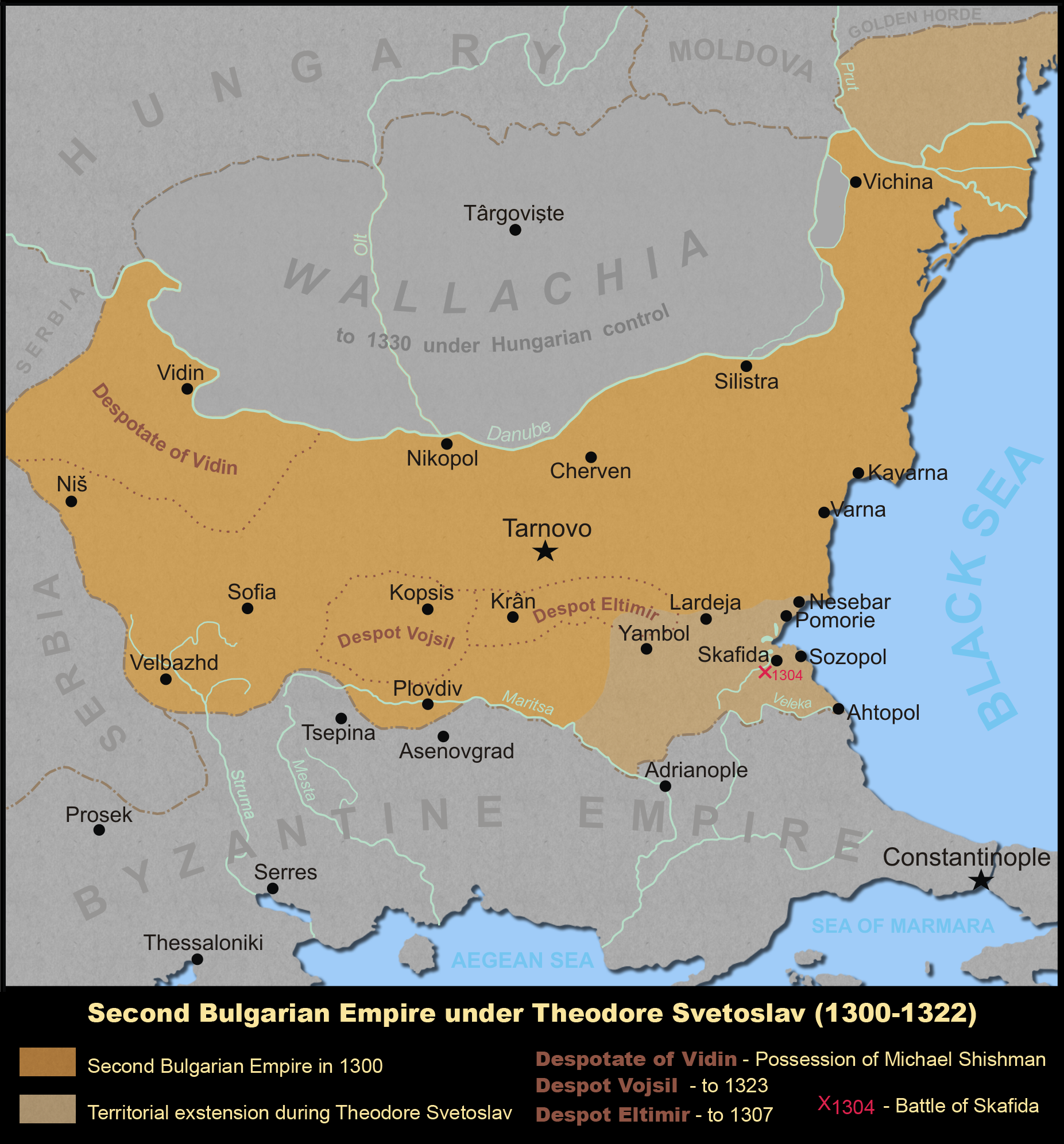
The Bulgarian Empire was still tributary to the Mongols in 1308.

As the head of the Mongol Empire, the Mongol Great Khans of the Yuan sent 100 dings of silver and 300 bolts of silk to the Golden Horde every year and the Jochid ruler Toqta was given additional fiefs in China for his diplomatic and military assistance to the Great Khan. Unlike the early years of the Mongol Empire, only the Great Khan's agents governed Chinese fiefs on the behalf of the Yuan and the Golden Horde until the collapse of the Mongol rule in China.

On his southwestern borders, Toqta arrested the Italian residents of Sarai and besieged Caffa in 1307. The cause was apparently Toqta's displeasure at the Genoese slave trade of his subjects, who were mostly sold as soldiers to Egypt. In 1308, Caffa was plundered by the Mongols.

During the late reign of Toqta, tensions between princes of Tver and Moscow became violent. Daniel of Moscow seized the town of Kolomna from Ryazan, which turned to the local basqaq for protection. However, this did not deter Daniel, who defeated the Ryazan and Mongol troops in 1301, and then seized Mozhaysk in 1303 and then Pereyaslavl, which threw off the already weak balance of interprincely relations. Daniel may have been motivated to round out his appanage, which in terms of the modern administrative divisions of Russia, was not larger than Moskovsky Uyezd before 1917. His tenacity laid the pattern for his successors to become the rulers of all of Russia proper.

Toqta organized a new conference for the princes in Pereyaslavl in the autumn of 1304, which was attended by leading princes including Andrey of Vladimir, Mikhail of Tver, and Yury of Moscow, Daniel's eldest son who succeeded him after his death in March 1304. Maximos, the metropolitan of the Russian Orthodox Church, was also in attendance. Toqta possibly intended to completely transform the political organization of his Russian ulus, though there is little information about the last years of his reign, with there only being accounts in the Russian annals of the interrelations among the princes, while Arab and Persian chroniclers focused on the Golden Horde's relations with Egypt and Iran. Toqta probably intended to eliminate the special status of the grand principality of Vladimir, and to place all the Russian princes on the same level as his vassals with a definite appanage assigned to each one of them. Toqta decided to personally visit northern Russia to settle the conflict between the princes, but he fell ill and died while crossing the Volga in 1312, according to the writer who continued Rashid al-Din's History.

== Islamization ==
=== Öz Beg Khan (1313–1341) ===
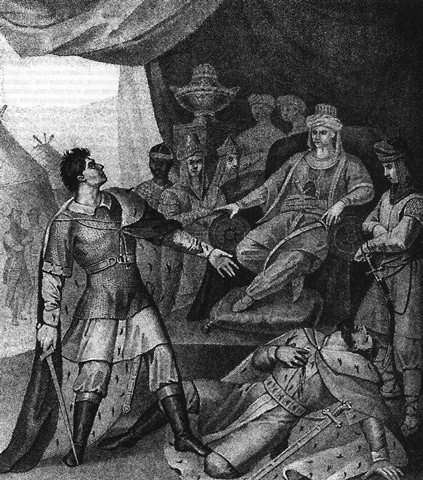
Dmitri avenging the death of his father in the ordo (palace) of Uzbeg Khan, killing Yury

After Öz Beg Khan assumed the throne in 1313, he adopted Islam as the state religion. He built a large mosque in the city of Solkhat in the Crimea in 1314 and proscribed Buddhism and Shamanism among the Mongols in the Golden Horde. By 1315, Öz Beg had successfully Islamicized the Horde and killed Jochid princes and Buddhist lamas who opposed his religious policy. Under the reign of Öz Beg, trade caravans went unmolested and there was general order in the Golden Horde. When Ibn Battuta visited Sarai in 1333, he found it to be a large and beautiful city with vast streets and fine markets where six "nations" – Mongols, Alans, Kypchaks, Circassians, Russians and Greeks – each had their own quarters. Merchants had a special walled section of the city all to themselves.

Öz Beg continued the alliance with the Mamluks begun by Berke and his predecessors. He kept a friendly relationship with the Mamluk Sultan and his shadow Caliph in Cairo. In 1320, the Jochid princess Tulunbay was married to Al-Nasir Muhammad, Sultan of Egypt. Al-Nasir Muhammad came to believe that Tulunbay was not a real Chingissid princess but an impostor. In 1327–1328, he divorced her, and she then married one of al-Nasir Muhammad's commanders. When Öz Beg learned of the divorce in 1334–1335, he sent an angry missive. Al-Nasir Muhammad claimed that she had died and showed his ambassadors a fake legal document as proof, although Tulunbay still lived and would only pass away in 1340.

The Golden Horde invaded the Ilkhanate under Abu Sa'id in 1318, 1324, and 1335. Öz Beg's ally Al-Nasir refused to attack Abu Sa'id because the Ilkhan and the Mamluk Sultan signed a peace treaty in 1323. In 1326 Öz Beg reopened friendly relations with the Yuan dynasty and began to send tributes thereafter. From 1339 he received annually 24,000 ding in Yuan paper currency from the Jochid appanages in China. Öz Beg allowed the Great Khan to export Russian, Alan and Kypchak soldiers to China. In 1316, possibly due to the discontent among Mongol elites in Iran, some of the Ilkhanid emirs approached Öz Beg to take the throne of the Ilkhanate, but the Jochid khan declined after consulting with his senior emir, Qutluq Timür.

Öz Beg, whose total army exceeded 300,000, repeatedly raided Thrace in aid of Bulgaria's war against Byzantium and Serbia beginning in 1319. The Byzantine Empire under Andronikos II Palaiologos and Andronikos III Palaiologos was raided by the Golden Horde between 1320 and 1341, until the Byzantine port of Vicina Macaria was occupied. Friendly relations were established with the Byzantine Empire for a brief period after Öz Beg married Andronikos III Palaiologos's illegitimate daughter, who came to be known as Bayalun. In 1333, she was given permission to visit her father in Constantinople and never returned, apparently fearing her forced conversion to Islam. Öz Beg's armies pillaged Thrace for forty days in 1324 and for 15 days in 1337, taking 300,000 captives. In 1330, Öz Beg sent 15,000 troops to Serbia but was defeated. Backed by Öz Beg, Basarab I of Wallachia declared an independent state from the Hungarian crown in 1330.

The domains of the Golden Horde in 1389

With Öz Beg's assistance, the grand prince Mikhail Yaroslavich won the battle against the party in Novgorod in 1316. While Mikhail was asserting his authority, his rival Yury of Moscow ingratiated himself with Öz Beg so that he appointed him as the grand prince and gave him his sister, Konchak, in marriage. After spending three years at Öz Beg's court, Yury returned with an army of Mongols and Mordvins. After he ravaged the villages of Tver, Yury was defeated by Mikhail, and his new wife and the Mongol general, Kawgady, were captured. While she stayed in Tver, Konchak, who converted to Christianity and adopted the name Agatha, died. Mikhail's rivals suggested to Öz Beg that he had poisoned the Khan's sister and revolted against his rule. Mikhail was summoned to Sarai and executed on 22 November 1318. Yury became the grand prince once more. Yury's brother Ivan accompanied the Mongol general Akhmyl in suppressing a revolt by Rostov in 1320. In 1322, Mikhail's son, Dmitry, seeking revenge for his father's murder, went to Sarai and persuaded the Khan that Yury had appropriated a large portion of the tribute due to the Horde. Yury was summoned to the Horde for a trial, but he was killed by Dmitry before any formal investigation. Eight months later, Dmitry was also executed by the Horde for his crime. The grand princely title went to Aleksandr Mikhailovich. In early 1326, Yury's remains were returned to Moscow and buried by the bishops of the Russian Orthodox Church headed by Metropolitan Peter.

Öz Beg's approach to Russian affairs was less constructive than that of Toqta, in which he made no attempt to change things in Russia, with his goal being to prevent the formation of a unified Russian state and to keep the balance between its princes, especially between those of Tver and Moscow. In 1327, the baskak Shevkal, cousin of Öz Beg, arrived in Tver from the Horde, with a large retinue. They took up residence at Aleksander's palace. Rumors spread that Shevkal wanted to occupy the throne for himself and introduce Islam to the city. The Tverians revolted after Shevkal established his office, and the Mongol commissioner and most of his lieutenants were killed. Öz Beg summoned Ivan I, the prince of Moscow, and ordered him to lead a punitive expedition along with Alexander of Suzdal; the Muscovite and Suzdalian troops, reinforced by Mongol detachments, looted Tver and captured thousands of prisoners. The incident, the Tver Uprising of 1327, caused Öz Beg to begin backing Moscow as the leading Russian state. Öz Beg refrained from giving Moscow too much power, giving the patent for the grand princely title to Alexander of Suzdal, though Ivan I would be appointed as grand prince four years later following Alexander's death, and given the right to collect taxes from other Russian potentates. As a result of the good relations between Ivan I and Öz Beg, the Moscow region began to prosper and its population grew rapidly. Ivan I also added to his grand princely title "and all Russia" in an imitation of the Russian Orthodox metropolitan's title, who moved his residence to Moscow, making it the ecclesiastical capital of Russia, but it also marked the beginning of the drive to unify Russia.

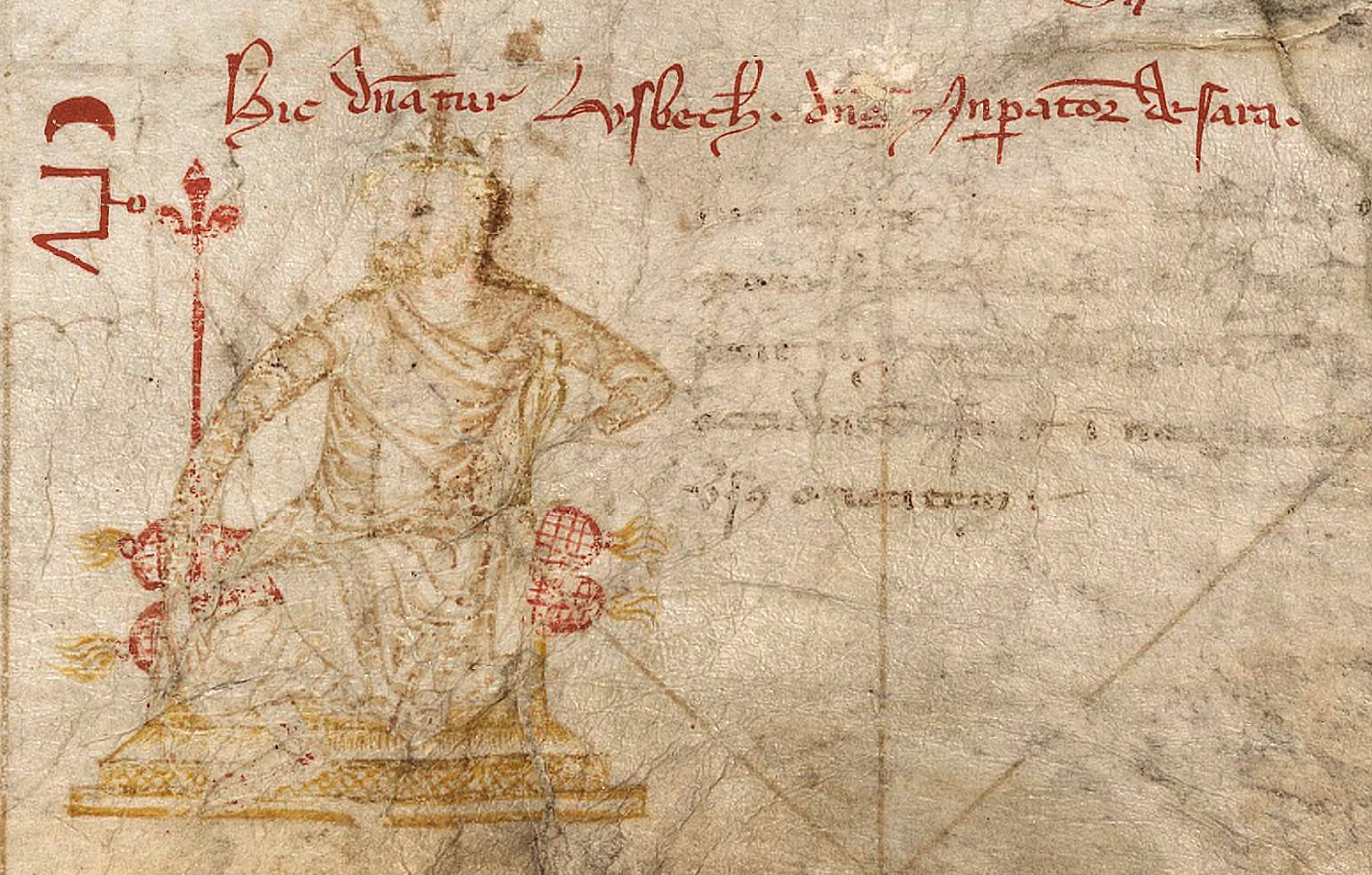
Özbeg Khan in the 1339 Dulcert map. Legend: Hic dominatur Usbech, dominus imperator de Sara, "Here rules Özbeg, the Emperor of Sara". The flag appears next to the ruler.

The Mongols had undermined the strength of Galicia and Volhynia, where the Danilovichi had sought to improve internal conditions in the country from the late 13th-century, with Yuri I assuming the royal title (rex Russiae) during his reign, but the Lithuanian grand dukes managed to build a strong army and administration as well as uniting the Lithuanian and Belarusian provinces under their rule. Following Yuri's death in 1308, the situation in Galicia and Volhynia quickly deteriorated, with both of his sons dying in 1323, leading to the throne to be offered to Boleslav of Mazovia. He was confirmed by Öz Beg as "Yuri II". Gediminas of Lithuania gained control of Kiev and installed his brother Fedor as prince, but the principality's tribute to the Khan continued. On a campaign a few years later, the Lithuanians under Fedor included the Khan's baskak in their entourage. Yuri II married a daughter of Gediminas and possibly gave his daughter in marriage to a son of Gediminas, leading to Öz Beg to intervene to prevent the plans of Poland and Lithuania. Mongol forces raided the borderlands of Lithuania in 1336 and then Lublin in Poland the next year. The prince of Smolensk defied Öz Beg's authority, instead recognizing the suzerainty of Gediminas. After the sudden death of Yuri II, who had no heirs, a committee of Galician boyars led by Dmytro Dedko took control of the city; a detachment of Mongol troops was sent to protect Galicia and Volhynia from the Poles, who were forced to retreat but did not give up on their claims to the region.

A decree, issued probably by Mengu-Timur, allowing the Franciscans to proselytize, was renewed by Öz Beg in 1314. Öz Beg allowed the Christian Genoese to settle in Crimea after his accession, but the Mongols sacked their outpost Sudak in 1322 when the Genoese clashed with the Turks. The Genoese merchants in the other towns were not molested. Pope John XXII requested Öz Beg to restore Roman Catholic churches destroyed in the region. Öz Beg signed a new trade treaty with the Genoese in 1339 and allowed them to rebuild the walls of Caffa. In 1332 he allowed the Venetians to establish a colony at Tanais on the Don. In 1333, when Ibn Battuta visited Sudak, he found the population to be predominantly Turkish.

=== Jani Beg (1342–1357) ===
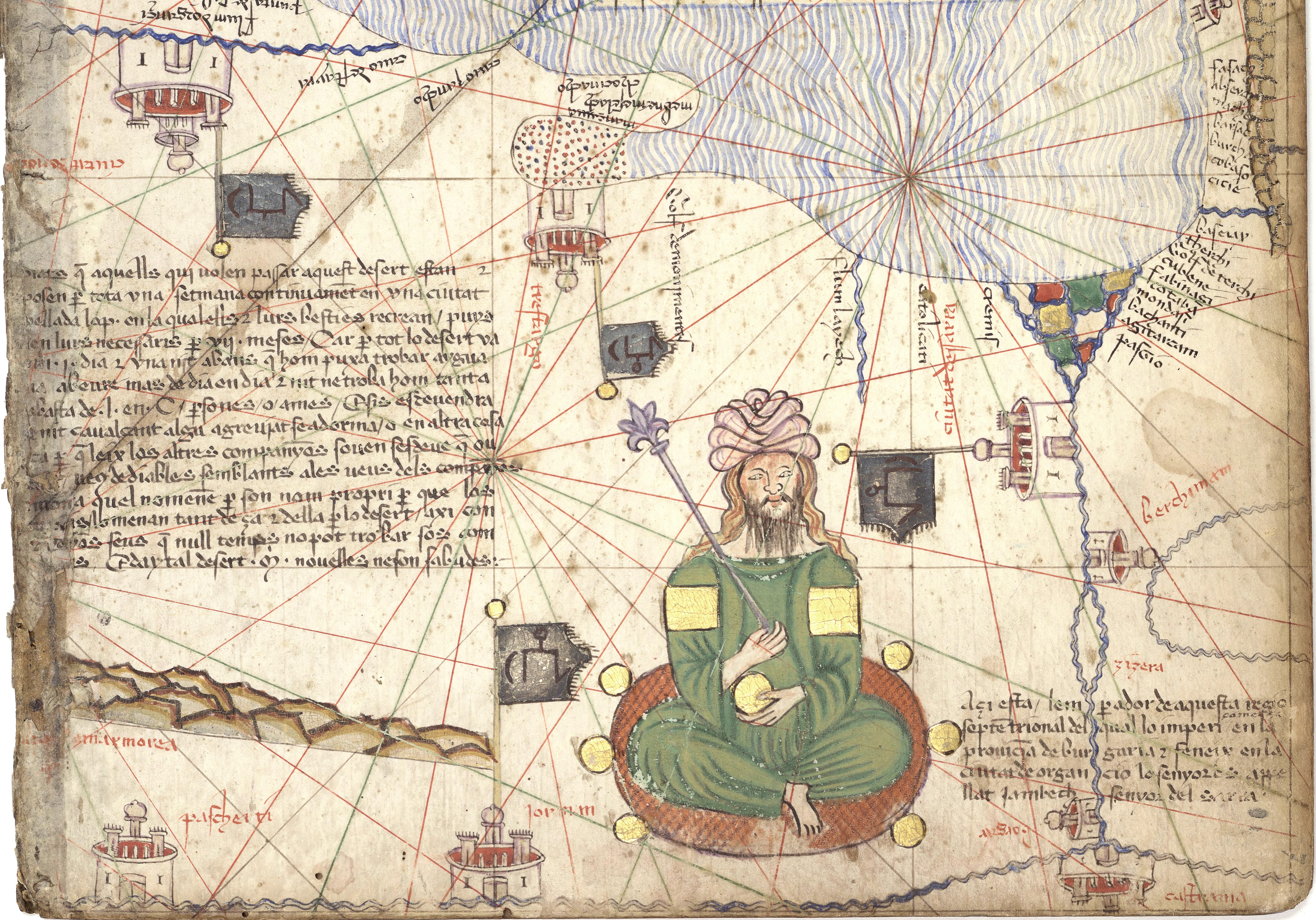
Jani Beg of the Golden Horde, as depicted in the Catalan Atlas (1375), with the flag of the Golden Horde:. The caption reads: "Here resides the emperor of this northern region whose empire starts in the province of Bulgaria and ends at the city of Organcio. The sovereign is named Jambech, Lord of the Sarra."

Öz Beg's eldest son Tini Beg reigned briefly from 1341 to 1342 before his younger brother, Jani Beg (1342–1357), came to power.

In 1344, Jani Beg tried to seize Caffa from the Genoese but failed. In 1347, he signed a commercial treaty with Venice. The slave trade flourished due to strengthening ties with the Mamluk Sultanate. Growth of wealth and increasing demand for products typically produce population growth, and so it was with Sarai. Housing in the region increased, which transformed the capital into the center of a large Muslim Sultanate.

The Black Death of the 1340s was a major factor contributing to the economic downfall of the Golden Horde. The disease likely first appeared in the region of Issyk-Kul. In the spring and summer of 1346, it had been reported in most cities, including Urgench, Sarai, and Azaq. It then reached Solkhat and spread among the ranks of Jani Beg's army during the siege of Caffa. According to a Russian source, the disease killed "Tatars" and other people all across the Horde. Although the death toll is unknown, the Horde likely suffered a significant loss of population. As entire regions were depopulated, the economy of the Horde went into steep decline. By the 1350s, parts of the northern trade route had collapsed.

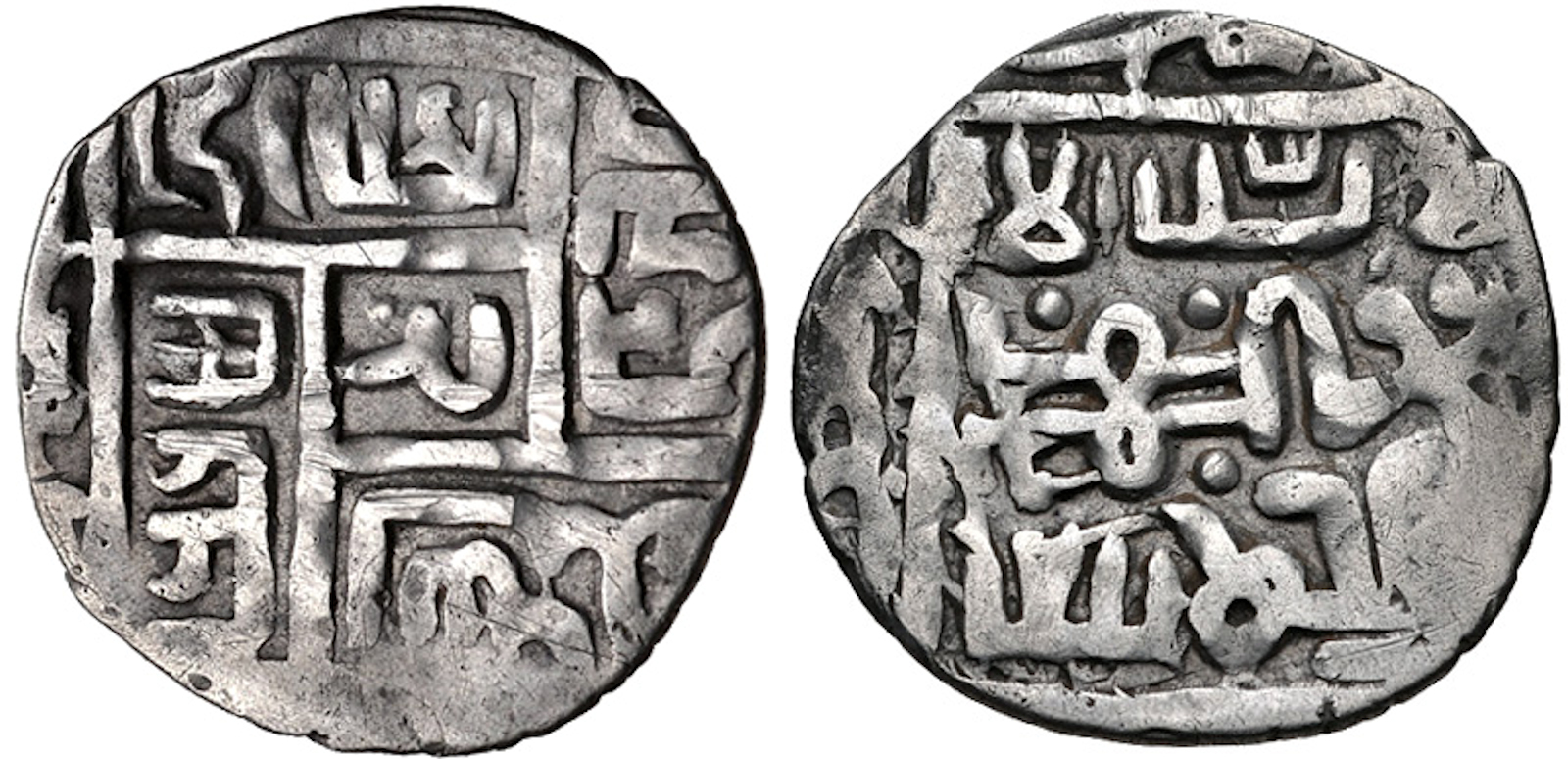
Coinage of Jani Beg (Jambek) II. AH 767–768 AD 1365–1366.

Jani Beg abandoned his father's Balkan ambitions and backed Moscow against Lithuania and Poland. Jani Beg sponsored joint Mongol-Rus' military expeditions against Lithuania and Poland. In 1344, his army marched against Poland with auxiliaries from Galicia–Volhynia, as Volhynia was part of Lithuania. However, in 1349, Galicia–Volhynia was occupied by a Polish-Hungarian force, and the Kingdom of Galicia–Volhynia was finally conquered and incorporated into Poland. This act put an end to the relationship of vassalage between Galicia–Volhynia and the Golden Horde. In 1352, the Golden Horde with its Rus' allies ravaged Polish territory and Lublin. The Polish king, Casimir III the Great, submitted to the Horde in 1357 and paid tribute in order to avoid more conflicts. The seven Mongol princes were sent by Jani Beg to assist Poland.

Jani Beg asserted Jochid dominance over the Chagatai Khanate and conquered Tabriz, ending Chobanid rule there in 1356. After accepting the surrender of the Jalayirids, Jani Beg boasted that three uluses of the Mongol Empire were under his control. However, on his way back from Tabriz, Jani Beg was murdered on the order of his own son, Berdi Beg. Following the assassination of Jani Beg, the Golden Horde quickly lost Azerbaijan to the Jalayir king Shaikh Uvais in 1357.

== Decline ==
=== Great Troubles (1359–1381) ===
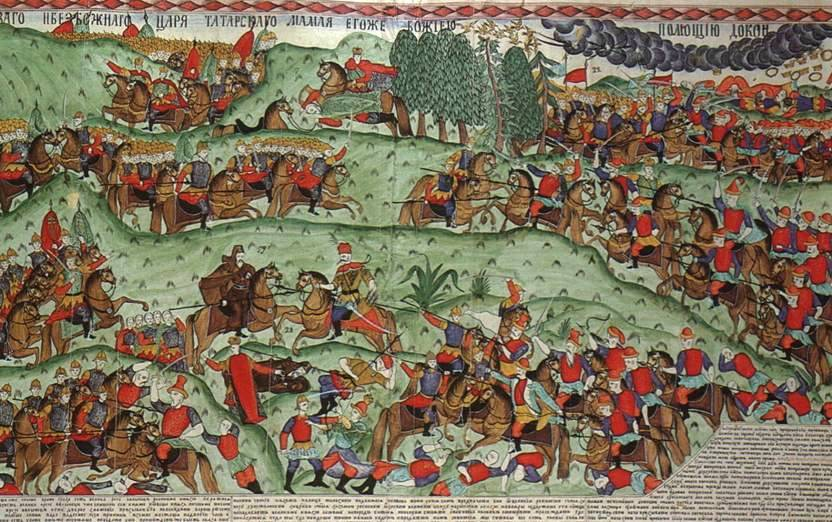
The Battle of Kulikovo in 1380

Berdi Beg was killed in a coup by his brother Qulpa in 1359. Qulpa's two sons were Christians and bore the Slavic names Michael and Ivan, which outraged the Muslim populace of the Golden Horde. In 1360, Qulpa's brother Nawruz Beg revolted against the khan and killed him and his sons. In 1361, a descendant of Shiban (5th son of Jochi) was invited by some grandees to seize the throne. Khidr rebelled against Nawruz, whose own lieutenant betrayed him and handed him over to be executed. Khidr was slain by his own son, Timur Khwaja, in the same year. Timur Khwaja reigned for only five weeks before descendants of Öz Beg Khan seized power.

In 1362, the Golden Horde was divided between Keldi Beg in Sarai, Bulat Temir in Volga Bulgaria, and Abdullah in Crimea. Meanwhile, the Grand Duchy of Lithuania attacked the western tributaries of the Golden Horde and conquered Kiev and Podolia after the Battle of Blue Waters in 1363. A powerful Mongol general by the name of Mamai backed Abdullah but failed to take Sarai, which saw the reign of two more khans, Murad and Aziz. Abdullah died in 1370 and Muhammad Bolaq was enthroned as puppet khan by Mamai. Mamai also had to deal with a rebellion in Nizhny Novgorod. Muscovite troops impinged on the Bulgar territory of Arab-Shah, the son of Bulat Temir, who caught them off guard and defeated them on the banks of the Pyana River. However Arab-Shah was unable to take advantage of the situation because of the advance of another Mongol general from the east. Encouraged by the news of Muscovite defeat, Mamai sent an army against Dmitry Donskoy, who defeated the Mongol forces at the Battle of the Vozha River in 1378. Mamai hired Genoese, Circassian, and Alan mercenaries for another attack on Moscow in 1380. In the ensuing battle, Mongol forces once again lost at the Battle of Kulikovo.

By 1360, Urus Khan had set up court in Sighnaq. He was named Urus, which means Russian in Turkish language, presumably because "Urus-Khan's mother was a Russian princess... he was prepared to press his claims on Russia on that ground." In 1372, Urus marched west and occupied Sarai. His nephew and lieutenant Tokhtamysh deserted him and went to Timur for assistance. Tokhtamysh attacked Urus, killing his son Kutlug-Buka, but lost the battle and fled to Samarkand. Soon after, another general Edigu deserted Urus and went over to Timur. Timur personally attacked Urus in 1376 but the campaign ended indecisively. Urus died the next year and was succeeded by his son, Timur-Melik, who immediately lost Sighnaq to Tokhtamysh. In 1378, Tokhtamysh conquered Sarai.

By the 1380s, the Shaybanids and Qashan attempted to break free of the Khan's power.

=== Tokhtamysh (1381–1395) ===
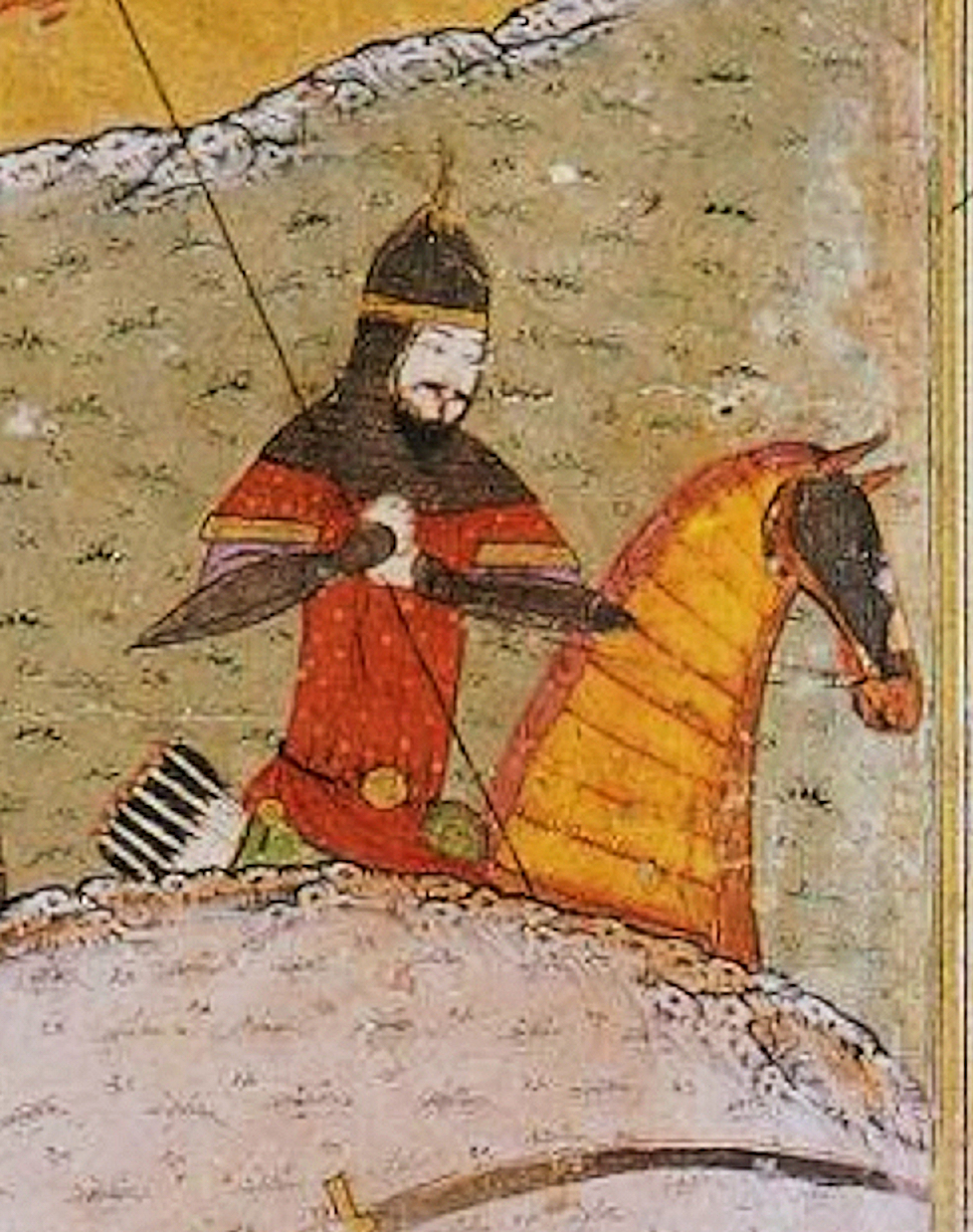
Depiction of Tokhtamysh in a 1391 battle with Timur. Miniature from Zafarnama (1436)

Tokhtamysh attacked Mamai, who had recently suffered a loss against Moscow, and defeated him in 1381, thus briefly reestablishing the Golden Horde as a dominant regional power. Mamai fled to the Genoese who killed him soon after. Tokhtamysh sent an envoy to the Russian states to resume their tributary status, but the envoy only made it as far as Nizhny Novgorod before he was stopped. Tokhtamysh immediately seized all the boats on the Volga to ferry his army across and commenced a siege of Moscow, which fell after three days under a false truce. The next year, most of the Russian princes once again made obeisance to the khan and received patents from him. Tokhtamysh also crushed the Lithuanian army at Poltava in the next year. Władysław II Jagiełło, Grand Duke of Lithuania and King of Poland, accepted his supremacy and agreed to pay tribute in return for a grant of Russian territory.

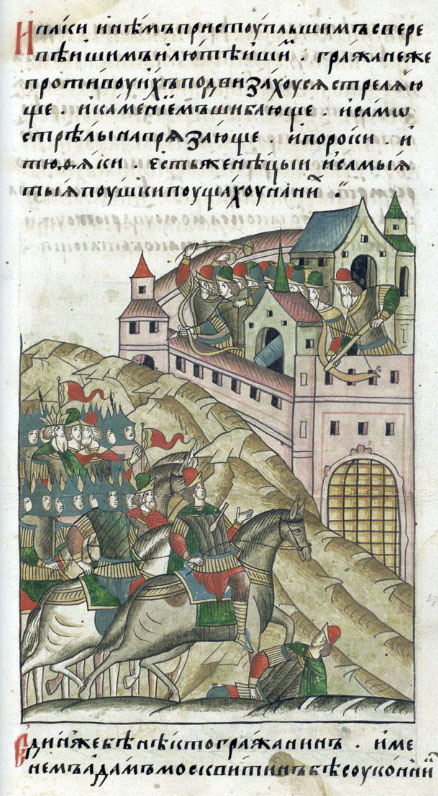
Tokhtamysh besieges Moscow.

Elated by his success, Tokhtamysh invaded Azerbaijan in 1386 and seized Tabriz. He ordered money with his name on it coined in Khwarezm and sent envoys to Egypt to seek an alliance. In 1387, Timur sent an army into Azerbaijan and fought indecisively with the forces of the Golden Horde. Tokhtamysh invaded Transoxania and reached as far as Bukhara, but failed to take the city, and had to turn back. Timur retaliated by invading Khwarezm and destroyed Urgench. Tokhtamysh attacked Timur on the Syr Darya in 1389 with a massive army including Russians, Bulgars, Circassians, and Alans. The battle ended indecisively. In 1391, Timur gathered an army 200,000 strong and defeated Tokhtamysh at the Battle of the Kondurcha River. Timur's allies Temür Qutlugh and Edigu took the eastern half of the Golden Horde. Tokhtamysh returned in 1394, ravaging the region of Shirvan. In 1395, Timur annihilated Tokhtamysh's army again at the Battle of the Terek River, destroyed his capital, looted the Crimean trade centers, and deported the most skillful craftsmen to his own capital in Samarkand. Timur's forces reached as far north as Ryazan before withdrawing from Russian territory. The Russian chroniclers claimed that a vision of the Virgin defending Moscow, accompanied by a heavenly host, convinced Timur to turn back. Vasily I of Moscow took advantage of the conflict and was given permission to take the throne of Nizhny Novgorod. Moscow's rulers also gained recognition from the khan that the grand princely throne was a family possession.

=== Edigu (1395–1419) ===
Temür Qutlugh was chosen Khan in Sarai while Edigu became co-ruler, and Koirijak was appointed sovereign of the White Horde by Timur. Tokhtamysh fled to the Grand Duchy of Lithuania and asked Vytautas for assistance in retaking the Golden Horde in exchange for suzerainty over the Russian lands. In 1399, Vytautas and Tokhtamysh attacked Temür Qutlugh and Edigu at the Battle of the Vorskla River but were defeated. The Golden Horde victory secured Kiev, Podolia, and some land in the lower Bug River basin. Tokhtamysh died in obscurity in Tyumen around 1405. His son Jalal al-Din fled to Lithuania and participated in the Battle of Grunwald against the Teutonic Order.

Temür Qutlugh died in 1400 and his cousin Shadi Beg was elected khan with Edigu's approval. After defeating Vytautas, Edigu concentrated on strengthening the Golden Horde. He forbade selling Golden Horde subjects as slaves abroad. Later on the slave trade was resumed, but only Circassians were allowed to be sold. As a result, most of the Mamluk recruits in the 15th century were of Circassian origin. Timur died in 1405 and Edigu took advantage to seize Khwarezm a year later. From 1400 to 1408, Edigu gradually regained the eastern Russian tributaries, with the exception of Moscow, which he failed to take in a siege but ravaged the surrounding area. Smolensk was also lost to Lithuania. Shadi Beg rebelled against Edigu but was defeated and fled to Astrakhan. Shadi Beg was replaced by Pulad, who died in 1410 and was succeeded by Temur Khan, the son of Temür Qutlugh. Temur Khan turned against Edigu and forced him to flee to Khwarezm in 1411. Temur himself was ousted the next year by Jalal al-Din, who returned from Lithuania and briefly took the throne. In 1414, Shah Rukh of the Timurids conquered Khwarezm. Edigu fled to the Crimea where he launched raids on Kiev and tried to forge an alliance with Lithuania to win back the horde. Edigu died in 1419 in a skirmish with one of Tokhtamysh's sons.

== Disintegration and succession ==
A map of successor states of the Golden Horde.

=== Khanate of Sibir (1405) ===
The Khanate of Sibir was ruled by a dynasty originating with Taibuga in 1405 at Chimgi-Tura. After his death in 1428, the khanate was ruled by Abu'l-Khayr Khan. When he died in 1468, the khanate split in two, with the Shaybanid Ibak Khan situated in Chimgi-Tura, and the Taibugid Muhammad at the fortress of Sibir, from which the khanate derives its name.

=== Uzbek Khanate (1428) ===
After 1419, the Golden Horde functionally ceased to exist. Ulugh Muhammad was officially Khan of the Golden Horde but his authority was limited to the lower banks of the Volga where Tokhtamysh's other son Kepek also reigned. The Golden Horde's influence was replaced in Eastern Europe by the Grand Duchy of Lithuania, who Ulugh Muhammad turned to for support. The political situation in the Golden Horde did not stabilize. In 1422, the grandson of Urus Khan, Barak Khan, attacked the reigning khans in the west. Within two years, Ulugh, Kepek, and another claimant Dawlat Berdi, were defeated. Ulugh Muhammad fled to Lithuania, Kepek tried to raid Odoyev and Ryazan but failed to establish himself in those regions, and Dawlat took advantage of the situation to seize Crimea. Barak defeated an invasion by Ulugh Beg in 1427 but was assassinated the next year. His successor, Abu'l-Khayr Khan, founded the Uzbek Khanate.

=== Nogai Horde (1440s) ===
By the 1440s, a descendant of Edigu by the name of Musa bin Waqqas was ruling at Saray-Jük as an independent ruler of the Nogai Horde.

=== Khanate of Kazan (1445) ===
Ulugh Muhammad ousted Dawlat Berdi from Crimea. At the same time, the khan Hacı I Giray fled to Lithuania to ask Vytautas for support. In 1426, Ulugh Muhammad contributed troops to Vytautas' war against Pskov. Despite the Golden Horde's greatly reduced status, both Yury of Zvenigorod and Vasily Kosoy still visited Ulugh Muhammad's court in 1432 to request a grand ducal patent. A year later, Ulugh Muhammad lost the throne to Sayid Ahmad I, a son of Tokhtamysh. Ulugh Muhammad fled to the town of Belyov on the upper Oka River, where he came into conflict with Moscow. Vasily II of Moscow attempted to drive him out but was defeated at the Battle of Belyov. Ulugh Muhammad became master of Belyov. Ulugh Muhammad continued to exert influence on Moscow, occupying Gorodets in 1444. Vasily II even wanted him to issue him a patent for the throne, but Ulugh Muhammad attacked him instead at Murom in 1445. On 7 July, Vasily II was defeated and taken prisoner by Ulugh Muhammad at the Battle of Suzdal. Despite his victory, Ulugh Muhammad's situation was pressed. The Golden Horde was no more, he had barely 10,000 soldiers, and thus could not press the advantage against Moscow. A few months later he released Vasily II for a ransom of 25,000 rubles. Unfortunately, Ulugh Muhammad was murdered by his son, Mäxmüd of Kazan, who fled to the middle Volga region and founded the Khanate of Kazan in 1445. In 1447, Mäxmüd sent an army against Moscow but was repelled.

=== Crimean Khanate (1449) ===
In 1449, Hacı I Giray seized Crimea from Ahmad I, and founded the Crimean Khanate. The Crimean Khanate considered its state as the heir and legal successor of the Golden Horde and Desht-i Kipchak, called themselves khans of "the Great Horde, the Great State and the Throne of the Crimea".

=== Qasim Khanate (1452) ===
One of Ulugh Muhammad's sons, Qasim Khan, fled to Moscow, where Vasily II granted him land that became the Qasim Khanate.

=== Kazakh Khanate (1458s–1470) ===
In 1458, Janibek Khan and Kerei Khan led 200,000 of Abu'l-Khayr Khan's followers eastwards to the Chu River where Esen Buqa II of Moghulistan granted them pasture lands. After Abu'l-Khayr Khan died in 1467, they assumed leadership over most of his followers, and became the Kazakh Khanate.

=== Great Horde (1430s–1502) ===
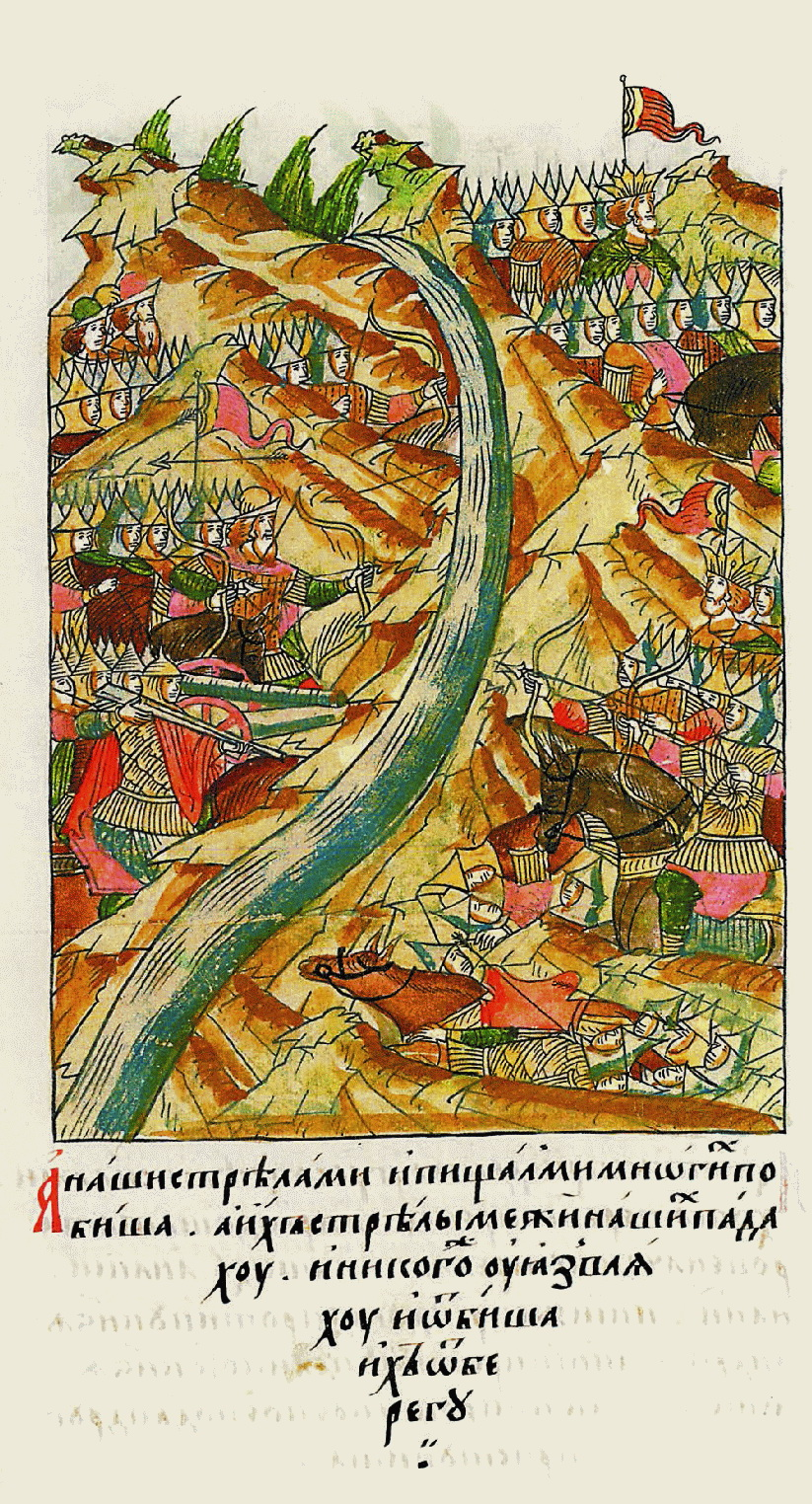
The Great Stand on the Ugra River in 1480, miniature from the Illustrated Chronicle of Ivan the Terrible

In 1435, the khan Küchük Muhammad ousted Sayid Ahmad. He attacked Ryazan and suffered a major defeat against the forces of Vasily II. Sayid Ahmad continued to raid Muscovy and in 1449 made a direct attack on Moscow. However he was defeated by Muscovy's ally Qasim Khan. In 1450, Küchük Muhammad attacked Ryazan but was turned back by a combined Russo-Tatar army. In 1451, Sayid Ahmad tried to take Moscow again and failed.

Küchük Muhammad was succeeded by his son Mahmud bin Küchük in 1459, from which point on the Golden Horde came to be known as the Great Horde. Mahmud was succeeded by his brother Ahmed Khan bin Küchük in 1465. In 1469, Ahmed attacked and killed Abu'l-Khayr Khan. Ahmed Khan attempted to subdue the former subjects of the Golden Horde, including the Russians and Uzbeks, with his goal being to once again unite the Horde.

In the summer of 1470, Ahmed organized an attack against Moldavia, the Kingdom of Poland, and Lithuania. By 20 August, the Moldavian forces under Stephen the Great defeated the Tatars at the battle of Lipnic. In 1474 and 1476, Ahmed insisted that Ivan III, the grand prince of Moscow, recognize the khan as his overlord. Ivan III also began the process of unifying the Russian principalities, which would strengthen Moscow's position against the Horde and Lithuania. In 1480, Ahmed organized a military campaign against Moscow, resulting in a face off between two opposing armies known as the Great Stand on the Ugra River. Ahmed judged the conditions unfavorable and retreated, particularly after receiving the news that Russian princes had rebelled against the Polish–Lithuanian ruler and were moving towards Sarai. This incident formally ended the "Tatar yoke" over the Russian lands. On 6 January 1481, Ahmed was killed by Ibak Khan, the prince of the Khanate of Sibir, and Nogays at the mouth of the Donets River.

Ahmed's sons were unable to maintain the Great Horde. They attacked the Kingdom of Poland and the Grand Duchy of Lithuania (which possessed much of Ukraine at the time) in 1487–1491 and reached as far as Lublin in eastern Poland before being decisively beaten at Zaslavl.

The Crimean Khanate, which had become a vassal state of the Ottoman Empire in 1475, subjugated what remained of the Great Horde, sacking Sarai in 1502. After seeking refuge in Lithuania, Sheikh Ahmed, the last khan of the Great Horde, died in prison in Kaunas Castle some time after 1504. According to other sources, he was released from the Lithuanian prison in 1527.

=== Astrakhan Khanate (1466) ===
After 1466, Mahmud bin Küchük's descendants continued to rule in Astrakhan as the khans of the Astrakhan Khanate.

=== Crimean conquest of the Great Horde ===
During the Lithuanian–Muscovite War of 1500–1503, the army of the Crimean Khanate conquered the last remnants of the Great Horde, sacking its capital city of New Sarai in 1502, and destroying it for good. The final blow to the Horde was delivered by Crimeans and Moldavians at the Battle of Samara River. The Crimean Tatars claimed the legacy of the Golden Horde, overlordship over the Khanate of Kazan as an appanage of ruling Giray dynasty, and suzerainty over Moscow. As soon as the Crimean Khanate had achieved the elimination of the Great Horde, however, the main reason for its alliance with Muscovy disappeared. The historian Charles J. Halperin noted: "The ad hoc alliance of Muscovy, Kasimov, Kazan', Astrakhan', the Crimea, and the Nogais collapsed almost immediately after accomplishing its purpose of destroying the Great Horde." By 1507, the houses of Moscow and Giray were in conflict, the focus becoming whoever controlled Kazan.

== Tributaries ==
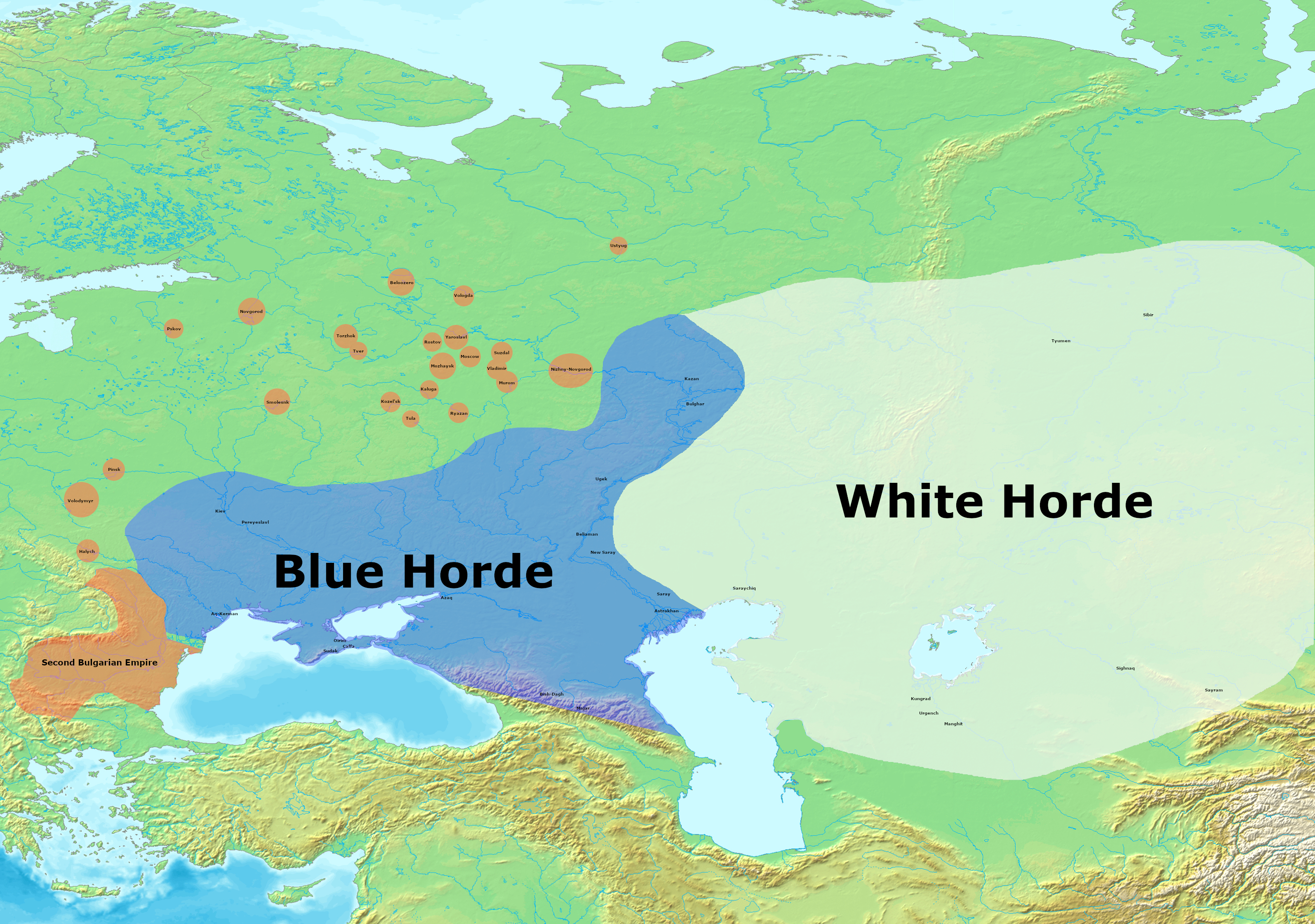
The Golden Horde and its tributaries in 1313 under Öz Beg Khan

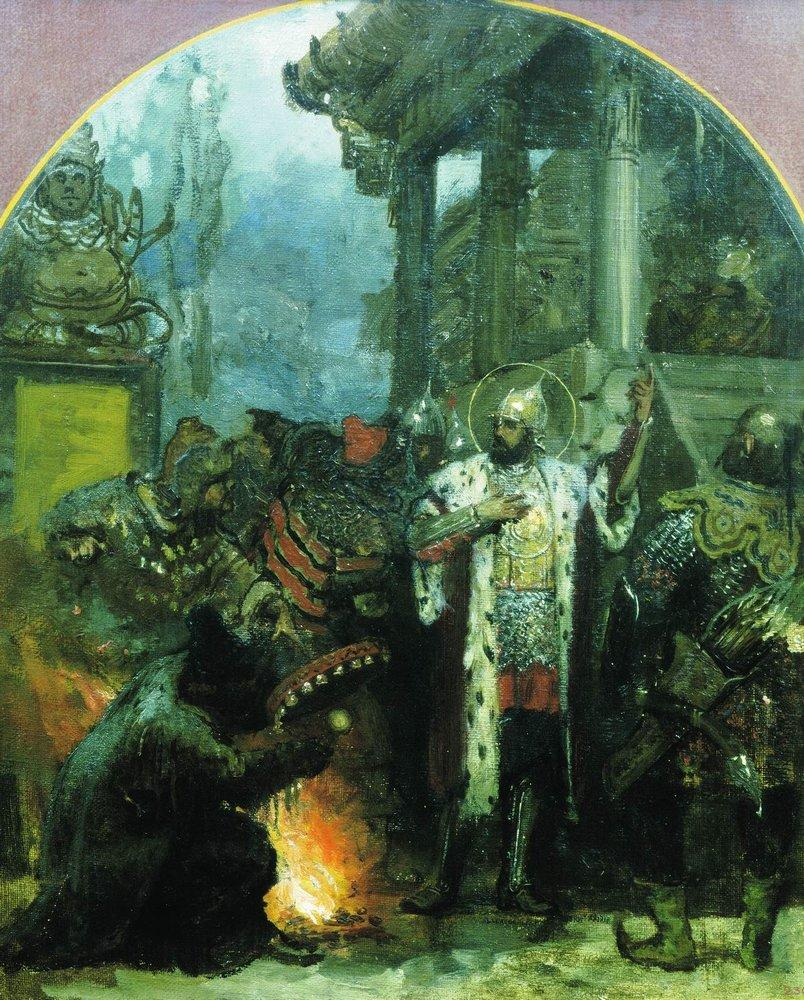
Alexander Nevsky and a Mongol shaman

The subjects of the Golden Horde included Alans, Armenians, Bulgarians, Circassians, Crimean Greeks, Crimean Goths, Georgians, Russians, and Vlachs. The objective of the Golden Horde in conquered lands revolved around obtaining recruits for the army and exacting tax payments from its subjects. In most cases the Golden Horde did not implement direct control over the people they conquered. Moreover, Jochird rulers owned a fief in Dunhuang, 41,302 households in Pingyang, Shansi, 10,000 households in Zhending and Chinzhou, and additional apanages in Liaoshan and Heshun in China, as well as large fiefs in Azerbaijan and Iran, which was acquired later by the Ilkhanate, that led to the conflicts between two Mongol dynasties, and 5,000 men in Bukhara.

=== Influence ===
Aristocratic Russians responded more uniformly to Mongol rule but the same cannot be said with certainty for the peasantry. There is not much evidence for Mongol influence on the Russian peasantry, whose direct contact with the Mongols was mainly through slavery or forced labor. Russian sources generally tend to focus on military encounters with the Mongols but the literary prose betrays a greater Mongol impact on Russian society than accepted at face value. There was a great deal of familiarity with the Mongols among writers, who recorded the name of virtually every Mongol prince, grandee, and official they came into contact with. The Galician–Volhynian Chronicle recounts the words of Tovrul, a captured informant at the Siege of Kiev (1240), who identifies the Mongol captains by name. Russian sources contain a list of the khans of the Golden Horde as well as more detail on their careers during the time of Great Troubles than Arab-Persian sources. Even the names of numerous lesser ranked Mongols are mentioned. The Mongol khan was called tsar, a title also used for the basileus. It is evident that the writers expected their audience to be familiar with the names of individual Mongols and their attributes despite their pervasive hostility.

While the Mongols generally did not directly administer all of the Eastern European lands they conquered, in the cases of the Principality of Pereyaslavl, Principality of Kiev, and Podolia, they removed the native administration altogether and replaced it with their own direct control. The Kingdom of Galicia–Volhynia, Principality of Smolensk, Principality of Chernigov, and Principality of Novgorod-Seversk retained their princes but also had to contend with Mongol agents who enforced recruitment and tax collection. The Novgorod Republic was exempt from the presence of Mongol agents after 1260 but still had to pay taxes. The Mongols took censuses in 1245, 1258, 1259, 1260, 1274, and 1275. No further censuses were taken after that. Some places such as the town of Tula became the personal property of individual Mongols such as the Khatun Taidula, the mother of Jani Beg.

The Russian aristocracy had to familiarize themselves with the workings of Mongol high society. (Note: "Clearly, the Russian bookmen's posturing notwithstanding, the Mongols were anything but an unknown and unknowable people. The Tatars, as an abstraction, were loathed on principle, but to the Russian elite their Tatar counterparts were far from being nameless, faceless enemies. Indeed, Russian aristocrats were probably more familiar with the higher levels of Mongol society than with the society of the Russian peasantry.") The prince had to receive a patent for his throne from the khan, who then sent an envoy to install the prince on his throne. From the time of Öz Beg Khan on, a commissioner was appointed by the khan to reside at each of the principalities' capitals. Mongol rule loosened in the late 13th century so that some princes were able to collect taxes as the khan's agents. By the early 14th century, all the grand princes were collecting taxes by themselves, so that the average people no longer dealt with Mongol overlords while their rulers answered to Sarai. The collection of the tribute was supervised by the grand prince of Vladimir, a title that was obtained by Ivan I of Moscow and kept by his successors.

Aristocratic familiarity with Mongol customs did not result in adopting Mongol culture. Any partiality shown towards Mongol customs could be dangerous, although in one instance they did adopt Mongol military attire. Mongols that moved into Russian society shed their former customs as they adopted Orthodox Christianity and despite the numerous mentions of Mongol atrocities, some more honorable portrayals do exist. In The Tale of the Destruction of Ryazan, the Mongol Batu exhibited chivalric courtesy to the Russian noble Evpaty by allowing his men to carry him off the field in honor of his bravery. Russian nobles also fought alongside the Mongols as allies at times.

Intermarriage did happen but was rare. Fyodor Rostislavich, Yury Danilovich and Gleb Vasilkovich married Mongol princesses. Gleb Vasilkovich spent his entire career among the Mongols in the steppes. Urus Khan's mother may have been a Russian princess. Such intermarriage ceased after the Golden Horde Mongols converted to Islam until the 15th century when the weakened Horde's Mongol grandees moved into Muscovite territory. Most of them entered into the service of grand princes, married aristocracy, converted to Christianity, and became assimilated. It is uncertain how much Mongol Tatar blood entered the Russian aristocracy. Some Mongols might have changed their names after converting while Russians took on Mongol nicknames as patronyms. The nobles of Ryazan and the Godunov clan of prince Chet claimed Tatar descent. Mongol ancestry was considered as prestigious as German, Latin, and Greek ancestry in the 16th century, although such views declined dramatically after the Time of Troubles. There was also intermarriage with their other subjects, such as between Berke and a Seljuk princess, and Jöge (eldest son of Nogai) and a Bulgarian princess.

==== Russian Orthodox Church ====
During early Mongol rule, the basqaqs collected taxes imposed by the Mongols, with only Russian clergy being exempt from the taxes, in a system known in Russian as baskachestvo (Russian: баскачество). These grants were translated from Mongol to Old Russian from the late 14th or early 15th century. In the privilege charters given to Russian clergy, the terms dan and poshlina are given, which, by the second half of the 13th century, primarily came to refer to the Tatar tribute.

The Mongols required the Russian Orthodox Church to pray for the health of the khan and in return they looked after the church's health and fostered its growth. A bishopric was established in Sarai for Russians and to act as an intermediary between the Golden Horde and both the Russian Church and Byzantium. The khans granted the Church significant tax privileges which enabled it to recover from the invasion and prosper even more than before. It was during the 14th century that the Church made decisive inroads into the pagan countryside, possibly due to the attraction of economic benefits bestowed upon Church lands that incentivized peasants to settle. The "Tale of Peters, tsarevich of the Horde" was written in the 14th century. It tells of how the Mongol Peter, a descendant of Genghis Khan, converted and founded the Petrov monastery. Peter's descendants used their ties to the khans to protect the monastery from the Rostov princes and the neighboring Russians who desired the fishing rights to that land. The depiction of Mongols by Church was mixed and awkward. It portrayed them as a disaster and their caretaker. This contradiction can be seen in the khans' portrayals in Church texts. Where the khans' names would have been in the missals, there was a blank space for the name to be read aloud orally. There was also a careful delineation between khan and "Tatars". Hagiographers sometimes absolved the khans from their role in killing Russian princes. After the khans' power began to wane in the 14th century, the Church gave its full backing to the Russian princes. However even after Mongol rule ended, the Church still invoked the Mongol model as an example of how they should be treated. In the 16th century, churchmen circulated a translated Mongol yarlyk that granted tax immunity to the Church.

==== Administration ====
The historian Charles Halperin cautioned: "To analyze the Mongols' administration of Russia requires meticulous examination both of the extant sources individually and of the larger picture they present. Many of the references to Mongol officials occur in unreliable texts from later periods, showing obvious signs of interpolation." Although it is evident that the Mongols started collecting taxes in the principalities as early as 1245 (shortly after they subdued them during or after the invasion of 1237), this appears to have been a localised affair with baskaki (singular baskak or basqaq, a Turkic word used in early sources meaning a local Mongol official who was primarily responsible for collecting tribute and conscripting troops), appointed per village, town or city, rather than a simultaneous imposition of a uniform taxation system.

During the first half of the 14th century, the basqaqs disappeared and the Russian princes themselves began to gather the total sum of taxes following a number of revolts at the end of the 13th century, leading to the princes to act as governors on behalf of the khan. The handling of Russian affairs was moved to Sarai, where various darughas supervised the Russian principalities. Along with the darugha of Moscow, other darughas may have existed with the same level of authority over other Russian territories such Ryazan and Tver. By the 14th century, the other drughas likely disappeared as the grand prince of Moscow assumed the role of collecting and presenting the taxes from all the Russian principalities. As the Horde became politically weakened and the grand princes of Moscow grew in power, it was possible for the tribute to be withheld, such as in 1372–1382 and 1396–1408. Ultimately, Ivan III stopped paying tribute in 1472–1476, leading to a standoff in 1480 which ended without military confrontation.

Moscow adopted the Mongol tax system and continued to collect tribute after they stopped passing it onto the Golden Horde. The Muscovite grand princes replaced the Mongol basqaq with officials called danshchiki who collected tribute known as dan, which was probably modeled after the Mongol tribute system. The Russians adopted the Mongol word for treasury, kazna, treasurer, kaznachey, and money, den'ga. The Muscovites used the Mongol customs tax system called tamga, from which the Russian word tamozhnya (customs house) is derived from. The yam postal system was adopted by Russia in the late 15th century as the peasants had already been paying a yam tax for centuries. The practice of poruka, collective responsibility of a sworn group, became more common in Russia during the Mongol period and may have been influenced by the Mongols. The Mongols may have spread the practice of beating the shins as a punishment from China to Russia, where this punishment for non-payment of debts was called pravezh. When the grand princes of Moscow collected the tribute, the term vykhod became more common instead of dan.

The existence of a double taxation system led to the increased exploitation of the Russian peasants and the gradual enrichment of the treasuries of the Russian princes; in addition, the tax obligations were greater for those who were poorer. The Russians also attempted to evade the yearly tribute, taking advantage of Tatar infighting, while at the same time also continuing the collection of tribute. The Tatar taxation system was exploitative for the Russian principalities during the 13th century, but by the 14th century, the grand principality of Moscow experienced uninterrupted economic growth starting from the reign of Ivan I. The grand princes of Moscow also manipulated the vykhod, which was made up of various taxes and tolls, allowing them to increase their revenue by imposing larger sums than was necessary, while the Tatar tribute was typically a negotiated sum. The most credible estimates put the amount of tribute between 5,000 and 7,000 rubles per year between 1380 and 1472, falling to 1,000 rubles after 1480. The tribute to the Horde decreased and was at times interrupted during the 14th and 15th centuries as a result of its political decline and the strengthening of Russian and Polish–Lithuanian authority.

==== Military ====
Some of the Mongols' subjects adopted Mongol military accoutrements. In 1245, Daniel of Galicia's army was dressed in the Mongol fashion after a visit to Batu Khan's camp. Austrian visitors to Daniel's camp remarked that with the exception of Daniel himself, all the horsemen dressed like Mongols. Muscovite cavalrymen were equipped in a similar fashion to the Mongols as late as the 16th century, when they were depicted using a Mongol-style saddle with Mongol stirrups, wearing a Mongol helmet, and armed with a Mongol bow and quiver. European observers mistook them for Ottoman dress. Muscovite armies also deployed in a similar fashion to the Mongols with the right guard ranked above the left (due to a shamanist belief). The emphasis on cavalry declined in the 16th century as warfare increasingly involved sieges in Eastern Europe than on the steppes with nomadic horsemen.

=== Loss of hegemony ===
The Golden Horde and other Turco-Mongol states in the 15th century

Mongol rule in Galicia ended with its conquest by the Kingdom of Poland in 1349. The Golden Horde entered severe decline after the death of Berdi Beg in 1359, which started a protracted political crisis lasting two decades. In 1363, the Grand Duchy of Lithuania won the Battle of Blue Waters against the Golden Horde and conquered both Kiev and Podolia. After 1360, payment of tribute and taxes from Russian subjects to the declining Golden Horde decreased significantly. In 1374, Nizhny Novgorod rebelled and slaughtered an embassy sent by Mamai. For a brief period after the victorious Battle of Kulikovo in 1380 by Dmitry Donskoy against Mamai, Moscow was free of Mongol control until Tokhtamysh restored Mongol suzerainty over Moscow two years later following a siege. Tokhtamysh also crushed the Lithuanian army at Poltava in the next year. Władysław II Jagiełło, the grand duke of Lithuania and king of Poland, accepted his supremacy and agreed to pay tribute in turn for a grant of territory. In 1395, Timur annihilated Tokhtamysh's army again at the Battle of the Terek River, destroyed his capital, looted the Crimean trade centers, and deported the most skillful craftsmen to his own capital in Samarkand. Timur's forces reached as far north as Ryazan before turning back. Tokhtamysh fled to the Grand Duchy of Lithuania and asked Vytautas for assistance in retaking the Golden Horde in exchange for suzerainty over the lands that were taken. In 1399, Vytautas and Tokhtamysh attacked Temür Qutlugh and Edigu at the Battle of the Vorskla River but were defeated. The Golden Horde victory secured for it Kiev, Podolia, and some land in the lower Bug River basin. Tokhtamysh died in obscurity in Tyumen around 1405. His son Jalal al-Din fled to Lithuania and participated in the Battle of Grunwald against the Teutonic Order.

From 1400 to 1408, Edigu gradually regained control of tributaries in Russia, with the exception of Moscow, which he failed to take in a siege but ravaged the surrounding countryside. Smolensk was lost to Lithuania. After Edigu died in 1419, the Golden Horde rapidly disintegrated but it still retained some vestige of influence in Eastern Europe. In 1426, Ulugh Muhammad contributed troops to Vytautas' war against Pskov and despite the horde's reduced size, both Yury of Zvenigorod and Vasily Kosoy still visited Ulugh Muhammad's court in 1432 to request a grand ducal patent. A year later, Ulugh Muhammad was ousted and fled to the town of Belev on the upper Oka River, where he came into conflict with Vasily II of Moscow, whom he defeated twice in battle. In 1445, Vasily II was taken prisoner by Ulugh Muhammad and ransomed for 25,000 rubles. Ulugh Muhammad was murdered in the same year by his son, Mäxmüd of Kazan, who fled to the middle Volga region and founded the Khanate of Kazan.

In 1447, Mäxmüd sent an army against Muscovy but was repelled. Another of Ulugh Muhammad's sons, Qasim Khan, fled to Moscow, where Vasily II granted him land that became the Qasim Khanate Both the khans Küchük Muhammad and Sayid Ahmad attempted to reassert authority over Moscow. Küchük Muhammad attacked Ryazan and suffered a major defeat against the forces of Vasily II. Sayid Ahmad continued to raid Muscovy and in 1449, made a direct attack on Moscow. However he was defeated by Muscovy's ally Qasim Khan. In 1450, Küchük Muhammad attacked Ryazan but was turned back by a combined Russo-Tatar army. In 1451, Sayid Ahmad tried to take Moscow again and failed.

In the summer of 1470, Ahmed Khan bin Küchük, ruler of the Great Horde, organized an attack against Moldavia, the Kingdom of Poland, and Lithuania. By 20 August, the Moldavian forces under Stephen the Great defeated the Tatars at the battle of Lipnic. In 1474 and 1476, Ahmed insisted that Ivan III of Russia recognize the khan as his overlord. In 1480, Ahmed organized a military campaign against Moscow, resulting in a face off between two opposing armies known as the Great Stand on the Ugra River. Ahmed judged the conditions unfavorable and retreated. This incident formally ended the "Tatar yoke" over the Russian lands.

In 1502, the Horde was absorbed by the Crimean Khanate.

== Trade ==
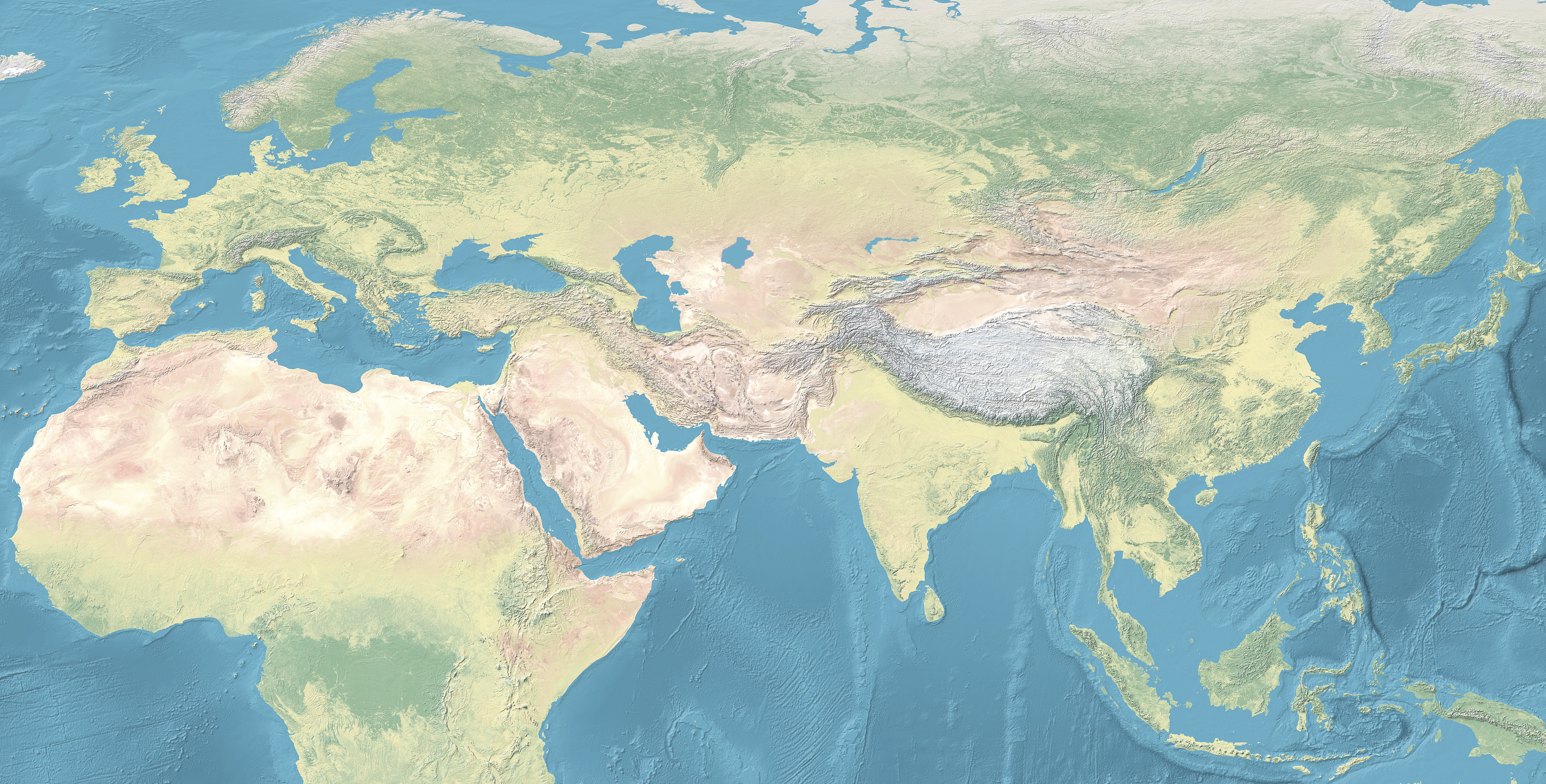
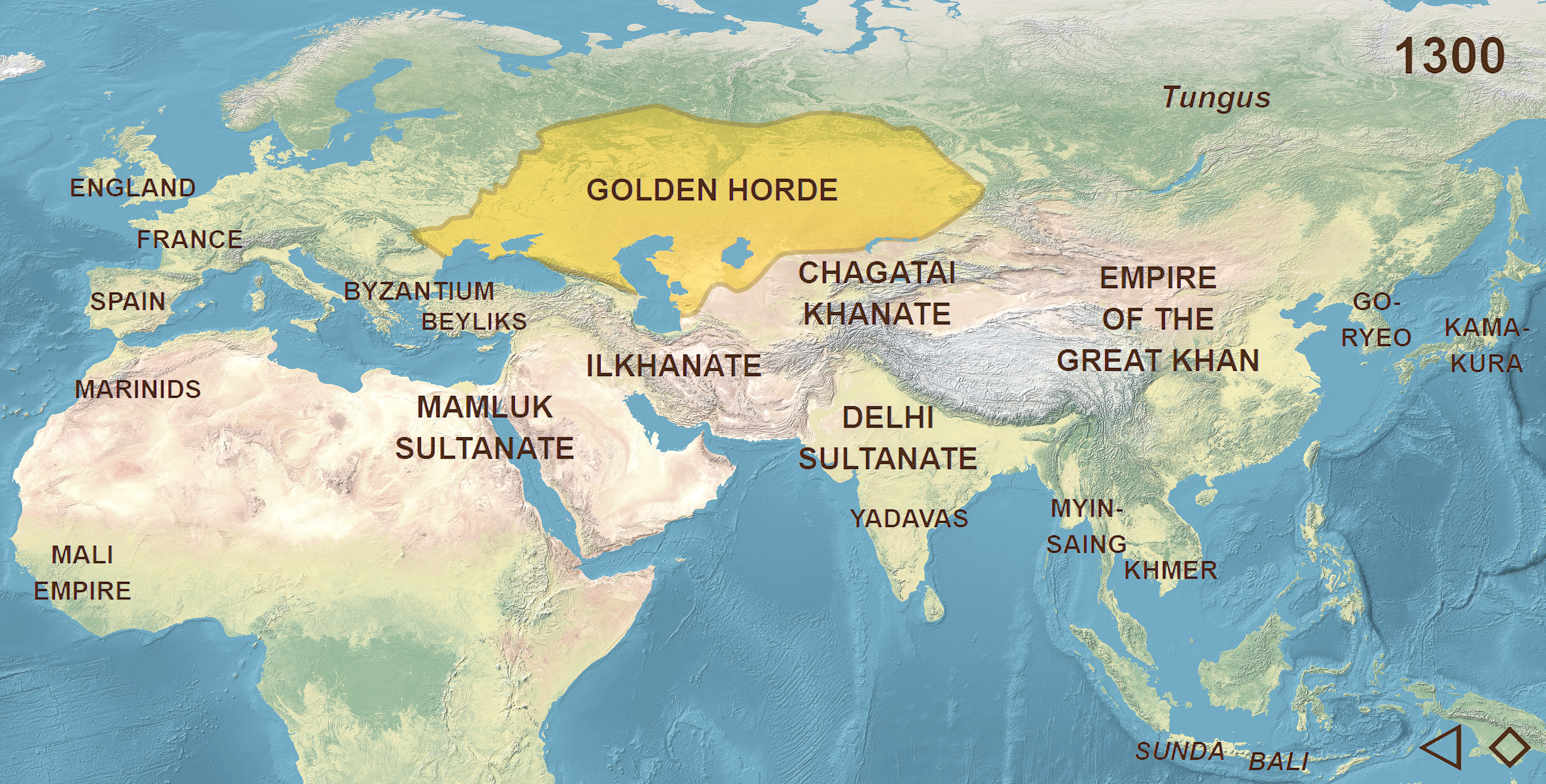
The Golden Horde, with contemporary polities, c. 1300

Sarai carried on a brisk trade with the Genoese trade emporiums on the coast of the Black Sea – Soldaia, Caffa, and Azak. Mamluk Egypt was the Khans' long-standing trade partner and ally in the Mediterranean. Berke, the Khan of Kipchak had drawn up an alliance with the Mamluk Sultan Baibars against the Ilkhanate in 1261.

=== A change in trade routes ===
According to Baumer the natural trade route was down the Volga to Serai where it intersected the east–west route north of the Caspian, and then down the west side of the Caspian to Tabriz in Persian Azerbaijan where it met the larger east–west route south of the Caspian. In 1262, Berke began a war with the Il-Khan Hulagu Khan. This led to several battles on the west side of the Caspian which the Horde usually lost. The interruption of trade and conflict with Persia led the Horde to build trading towns along the northern route. They also allied with the Mamluks of Egypt who were the Il-Khan's enemies. Trade between the Horde and Egypt was carried by the Genoese based in Crimea. An important part of this trade was slaves for the Mamluk army. Trade was weakened by a quarrel with the Genoese in 1307 and a Mamluk-Persian peace in 1323. Circa 1336 the Ilkhanate began to disintegrate which shifted trade north. Around 1340, the route north of the Caspian was described by Pegolotti. In 1347 a Horde siege of the Genoese Crimean port of Kaffa led to the spread of the black death to Europe. In 1395–96 Tamerlane laid waste to the Horde's trading towns. Since they had no agricultural hinterland many of the towns vanished and trade shifted south.

== Geography and society ==
Genghis Khan assigned four Mongol mingghans: the Sanchi'ud (or Salji'ud), Keniges, Uushin, and Je'ured clans to Jochi. By the beginning of the 14th century, noyans from the Sanchi'ud, Hongirat, Ongud (Arghun), Keniges, Jajirad, Besud, Oirat, and Je'ured clans held importants positions at the court or elsewhere. There existed four mingghans (4,000) of the Jalayir in the left wing of the Ulus of Jochi (Golden Horde).

The population of the Golden Horde was largely a mixture of Turks and Mongols who adopted Islam later, as well as smaller numbers of Finno-Ugric peoples, Sarmato-Scythians, Slavs, and people from the Caucasus, among others (whether Muslim or not). Most of the Horde's population was Turkic: Kipchaks, Cumans, Volga Bulgars, Khwarezmians, and others. The Horde was gradually Turkified and lost its Mongol identity, while the descendants of Batu's original Mongol warriors constituted the upper class. They were commonly named the Tatars by the Russians and Europeans. Russians preserved this common name for this group down to the 20th century. Whereas most members of this group identified themselves by their ethnic or tribal names, most also considered themselves to be Muslims. Most of the population, both agricultural and nomadic, adopted the Kypchak language, which developed into the regional languages of Kypchak groups after the Horde disintegrated.

The descendants of Batu ruled the Golden Horde from Sarai Batu and later Sarai Berke, controlling an area ranging from the Volga River and the Carpathian Mountains to the mouth of the Danube River. The descendants of Orda ruled the area from the Ural River to Lake Balkhash. Censuses recorded Chinese living quarters in the Tatar parts of Novgorod, Tver and Moscow.

=== Internal organization ===
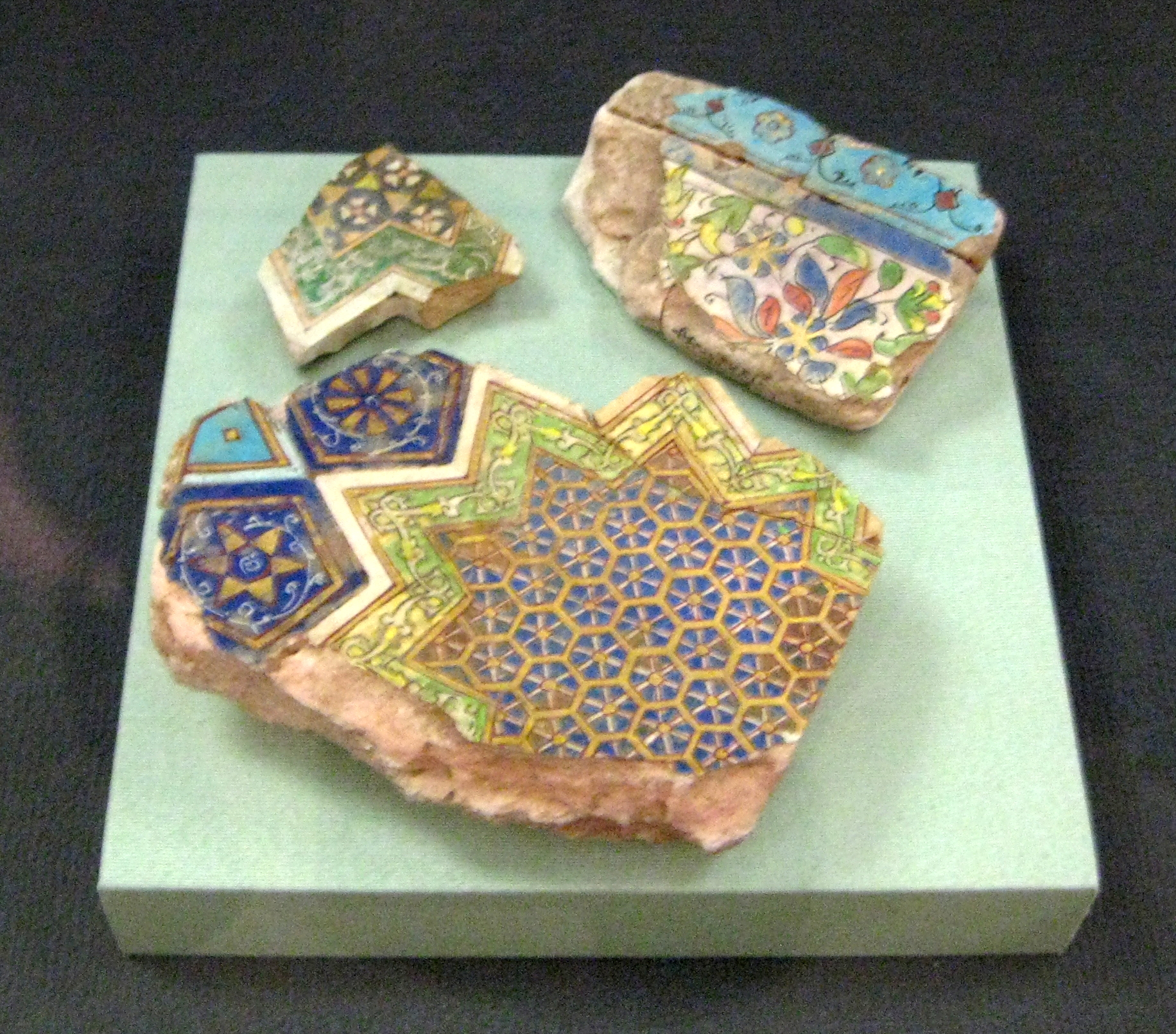
Tilework fragments of a palace in Sarai

The Golden Horde's elites were descended from four Mongol clans, Qiyat, Manghut, Sicivut and Qonqirat. Their supreme ruler was the Khan, chosen by the kurultai among Batu Khan's descendants. The prime minister, also ethnically Mongol, was known as "prince of princes", or beklare-bek. The ministers were called viziers. Local governors, or basqaqs, were responsible for levying taxes and dealing with popular discontent. Civil and military administration, as a rule, were not separate.

The Horde developed as a sedentary rather than nomadic culture, with Sarai evolving into a large, prosperous metropolis. In the early 14th century, the capital was moved considerably upstream to Sarai Berqe, which became one of the largest cities of the medieval world, with 600,000 inhabitants. Sarai was described by the famous traveller Ibn Battuta as "one of the most beautiful cities ... full of people, with the beautiful bazaars and wide streets", and having 13 congregational mosques along with "plenty of lesser mosques". Another contemporary source describes it as "a grand city accommodating markets, baths and religious institutions". An astrolabe was discovered during excavations at the site and the city was home to many poets, most of whom are known to us only by name.

Despite Russian efforts at proselytizing in Sarai, the Mongols clung to their traditional animist or shamanist beliefs until Uzbeg Khan (1312–1341) adopted Islam as a state religion. Several rulers – Mikhail of Chernigov and Mikhail of Tver among them – were reportedly assassinated in Sarai, but the khans were generally tolerant and even released the Russian Orthodox Church from paying taxes. The conquered peoples were not discouraged from practicing their religion and religious dignitaries had protected status whenever they visited the Golden Horde. The Franciscan friar Iohanca wrote in 1320 that they "could not care less to what religion someone belongs as long as he performs the required services, pay tributes and taxes and satisfies his military obligations according to their laws". Russian Orthodox clergy in particular often enjoyed the protection of the khan and the Russian Church flourished under Mongol rule.

=== Provinces ===
The Golden Horde majorly was divided into the Blue Horde (kok orda) and the White Horde (ak orda). The Chinggis Nāme says that the yassa "gave Sayin khan the right wing with the regions surrounding the River Itil [Volga], and he gave Ejen the left wing with the regions near the Syr Daria River".

==== Vassal territories ====
- Venetian port cities in Crimea (center at Qırım). After the Mongol conquest in 1238, the port cities in Crimea paid the Jochids custom duties, and the revenues were divided among all Chingisid princes of the Mongol Empire in accordance with the appanage system.,
- the banks of Azov,
- the country of Circassians,
- Walachia,
- Alania,
- Russian principalities. The khans considered the principalities to be part of their dominion and therefore took censuses in order to tax the people who lived there. Although direct rule was not imposed, the grand prince of Vladimir, the leading Russian prince, was closely supervised and the khans later placed the throne in the hands of Moscow.

== Genetics ==
A 2018 genetic study published in Nature examined the remains of two males buried in the Ulytau District in Kazakhstan c. 1300. One male, who was a Buddhist member of the Golden Horde army, was of East Asian ancestry and carried paternal haplogroup C3 and the maternal haplogroup D4m2. The other male, who was of West Eurasian (European) ancestry, was a carrier of the paternal haplogroup R1 and the maternal haplogroup I1b. According to the authors, this could suggest assimilation of distinct ethnic groups in to the Golden Horde, however he could also be servant or slave.

A 2021 study published in the Journal of Human Genetics found that the Alshyn alliance of Western Kazakhs shares a common paternal founder belonging to C2a1a2-M48. The authors estimated that this founder lived approximately 500–700 years ago, corresponding to the period traditionally associated with Emir Alau. According to historical sources, Alau was an emir who served under Jani Beg (r. 1342–1357) of the Golden Horde. The authors noted that the genetic findings are consistent with traditional genealogical accounts and nomadic traditions.

Some anthropological studies, such as those by Orazak Ismagulov, show that the modern Kazakhs are indistinguishable from the nomadic peoples of the Golden Horde. This is further supported by cluster analysis conducted by Leonid Yablonsky, who found that Kazakhs are genetically closest to the nomads of the Golden Horde (Lower Volga), while modern Volga-Ural Tatars, Uzbeks, and Chuvash are more closely related to the urban population of that period.

== Coinage ==
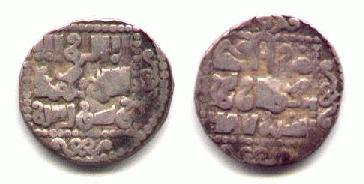
Talabuga's coin, dating c. 1287–1291 AD

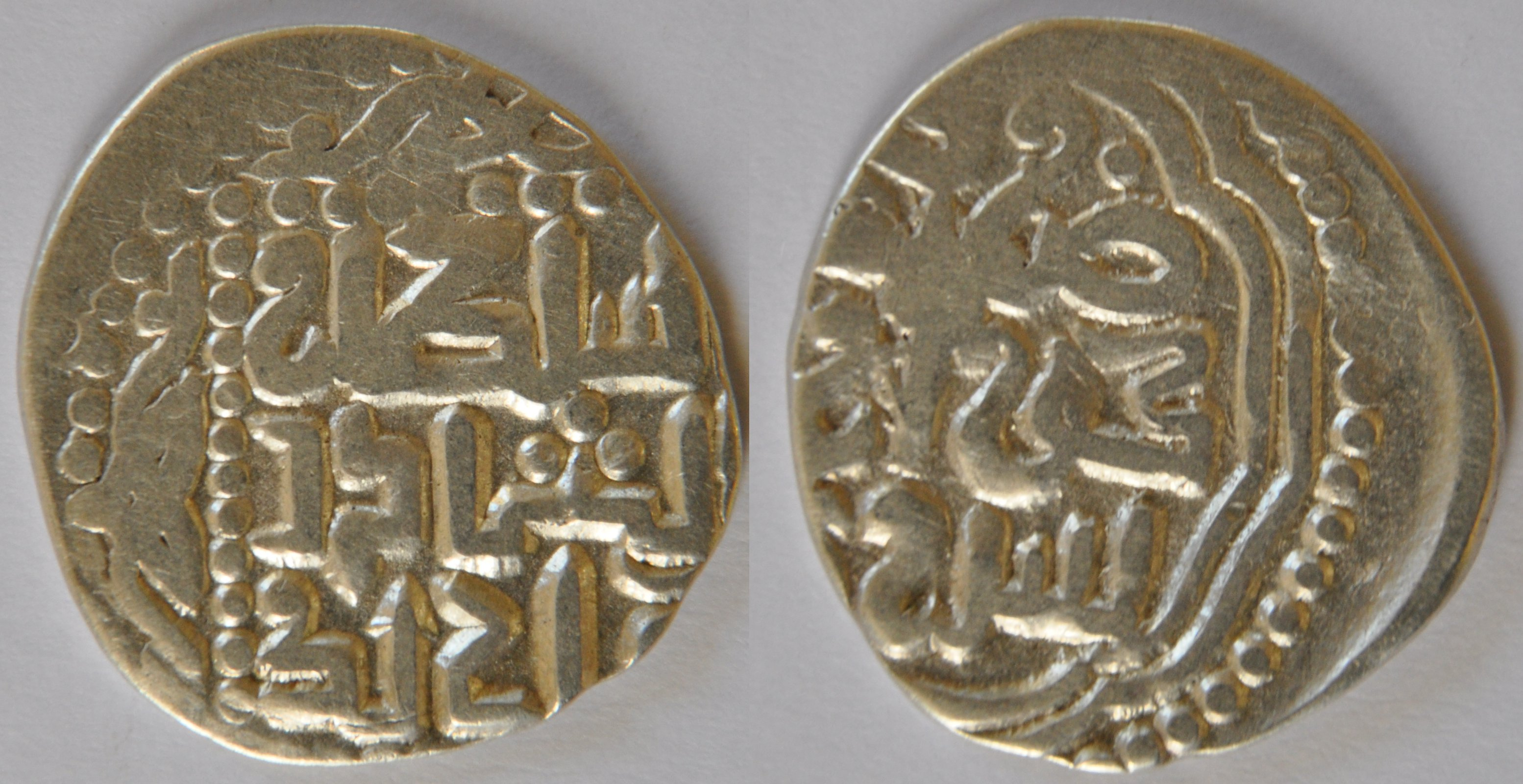
Jani Beg's coin, dating c. 1342–1357 AD

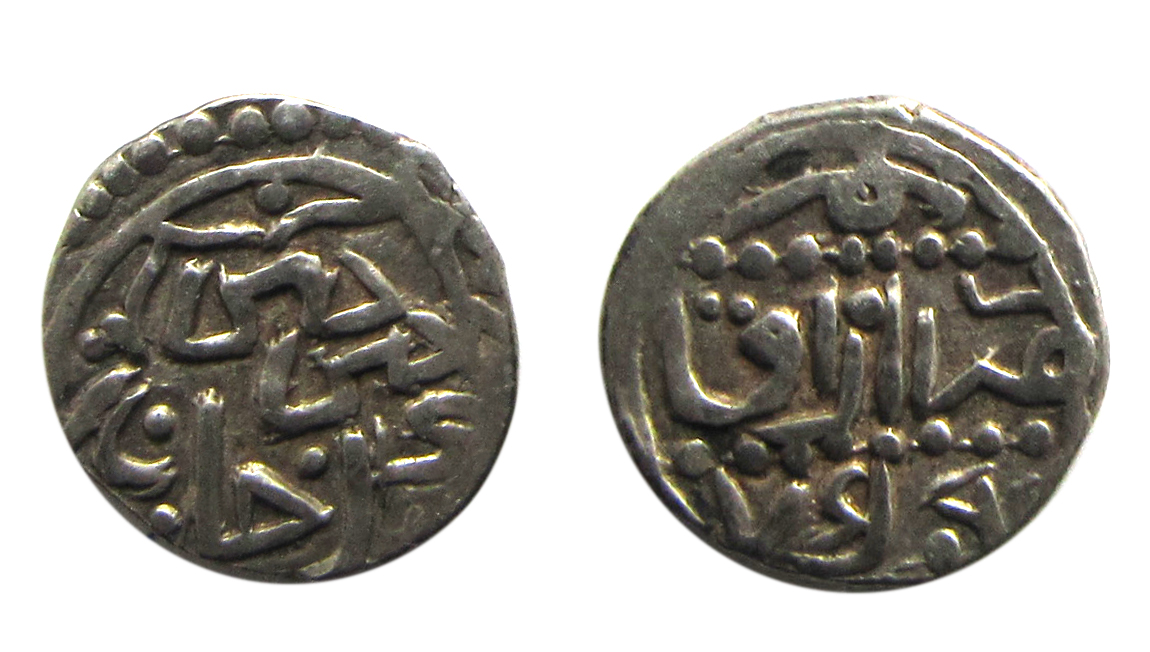
Berdi Beg's coin minted in Azak, dating c. 1357 AD

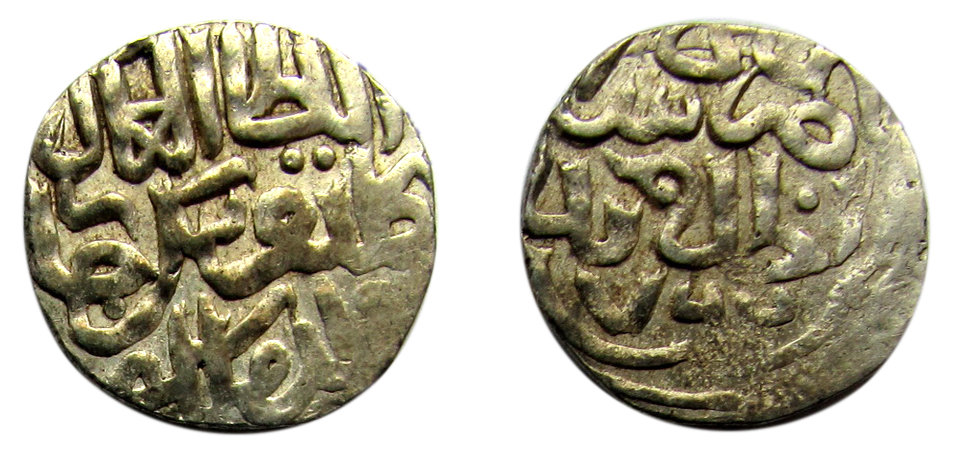
Kildibeg's coin minted in Sarai, dating c. 1360 AD

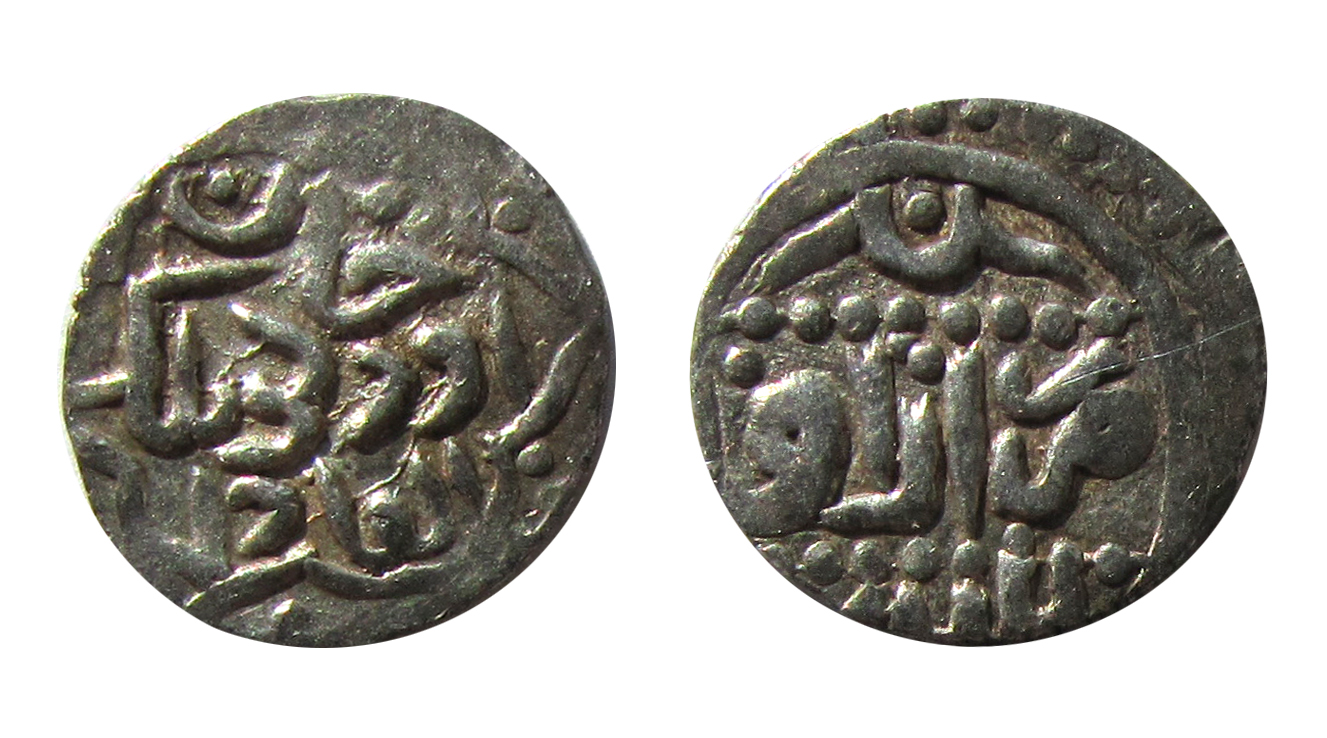
Ordumelik's coin minted in Azak, dating c. 1360 AD

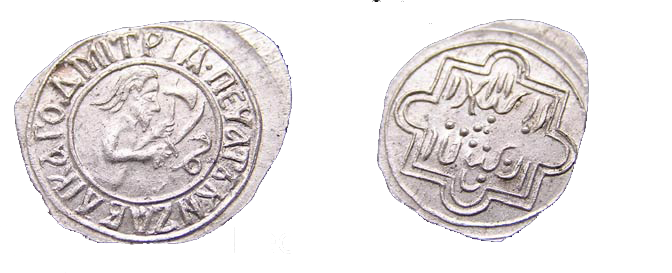
Muscovite coin minted in the name of Abdullah ibn Uzbeg, dating c. 1367–1368 or 1369–1370

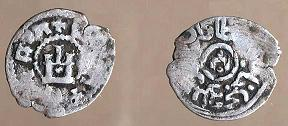
Dawlat Berdi's coin minted in Kaffa, dating c. 1419–1421 or 1428–1432 AD

== Gallery ==
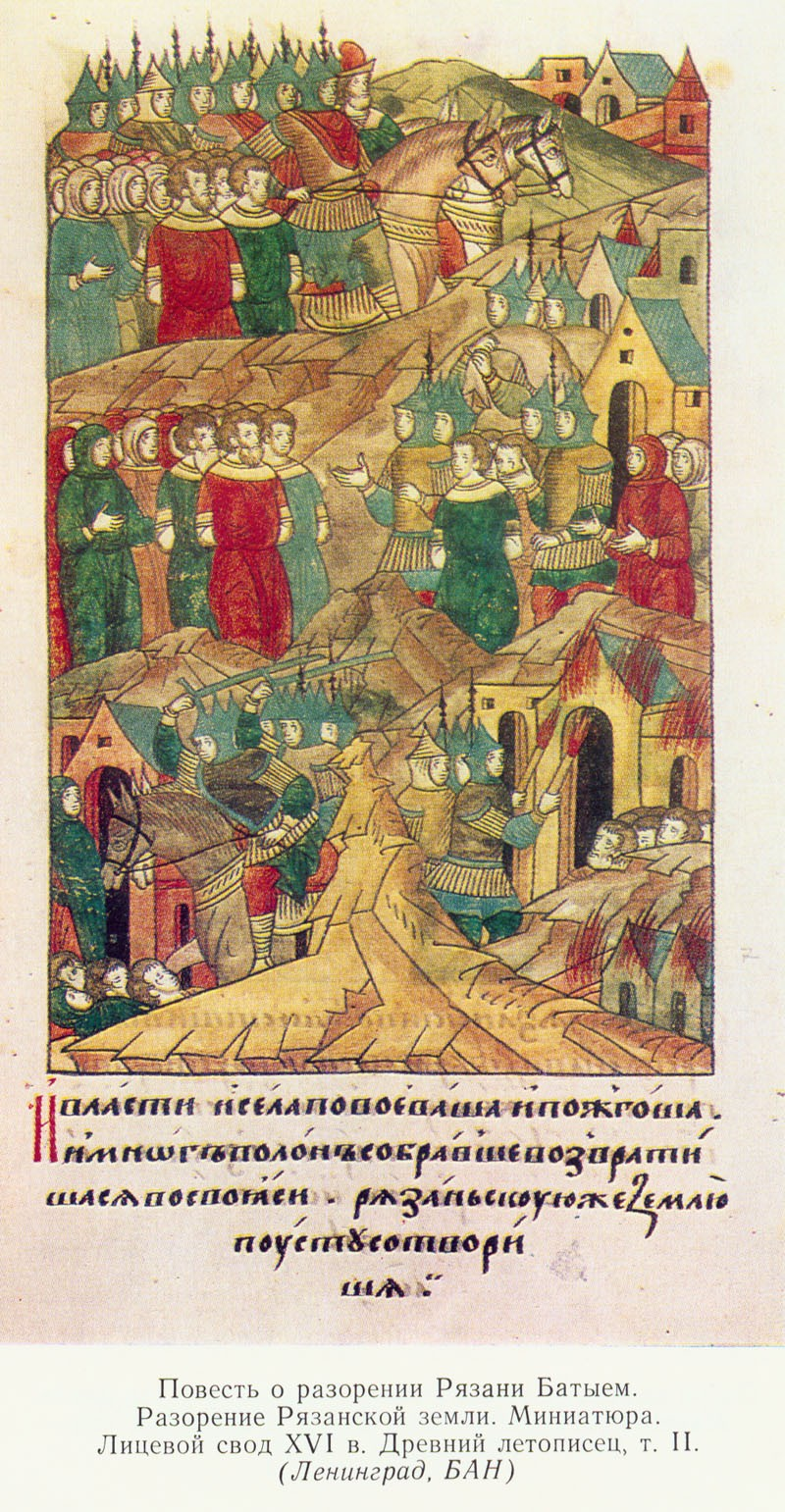
The Golden Horde raids Ryazan, miniature from the Illustrated Chronicle of Ivan the Terrible

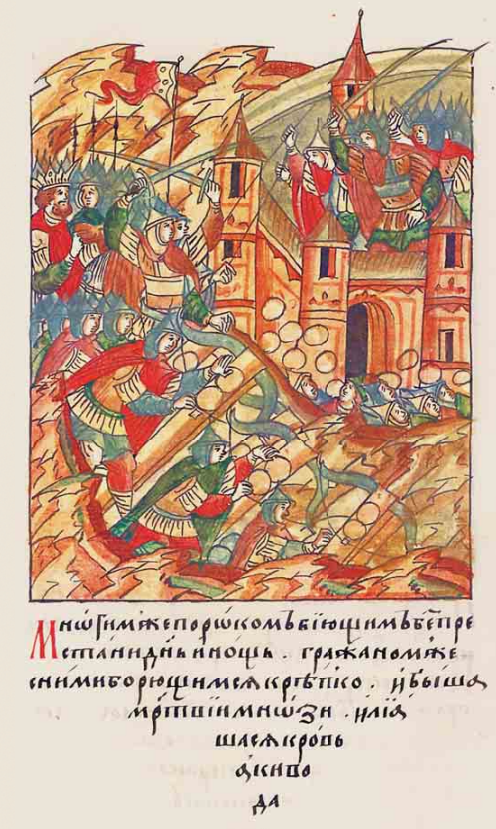
The Golden Horde raids Kiev, miniature from the Illustrated Chronicle of Ivan the Terrible

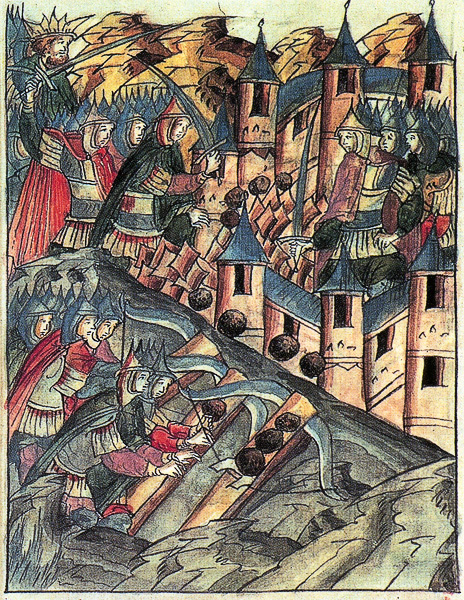
The Golden Horde raids Kozelsk, miniature from the Illustrated Chronicle of Ivan the Terrible

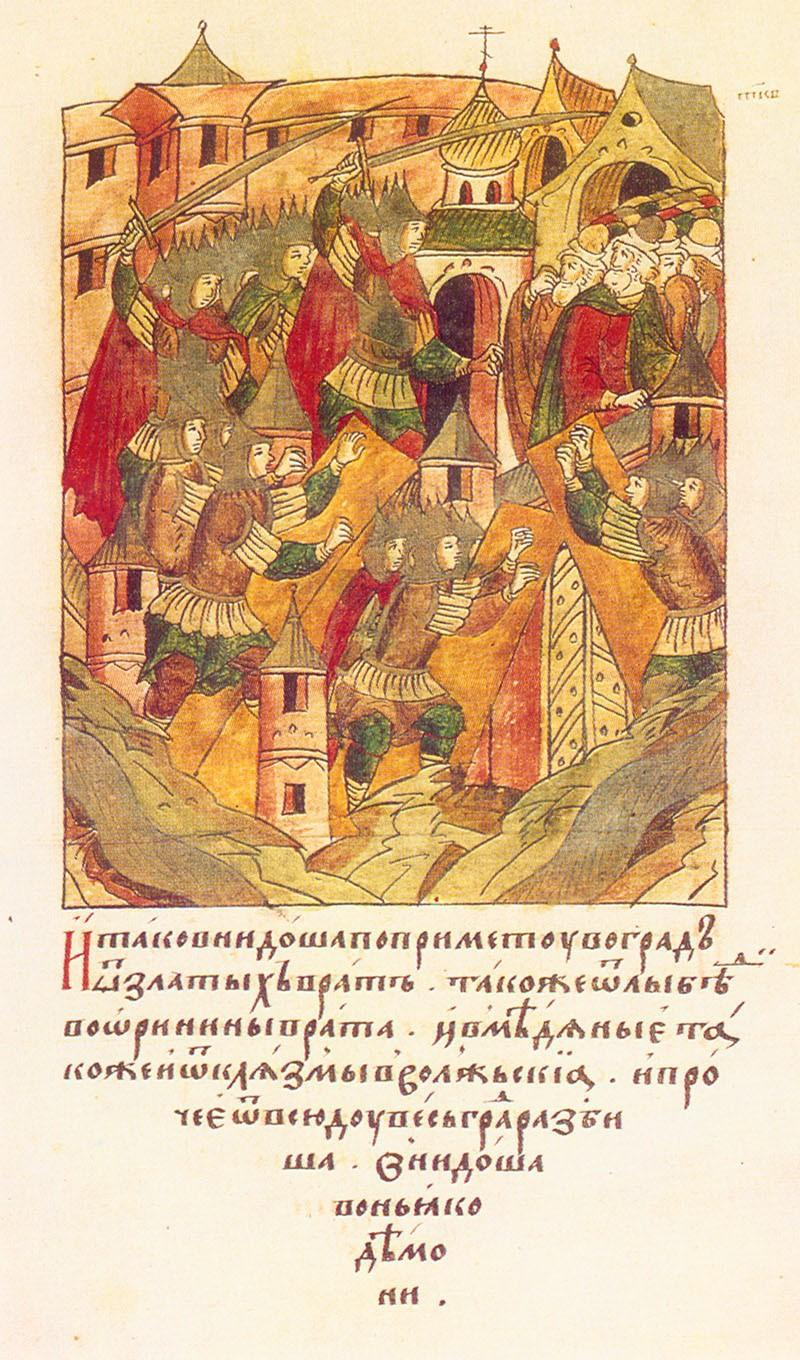
The Golden Horde raids Vladimir, miniature from the Illustrated Chronicle of Ivan the Terrible

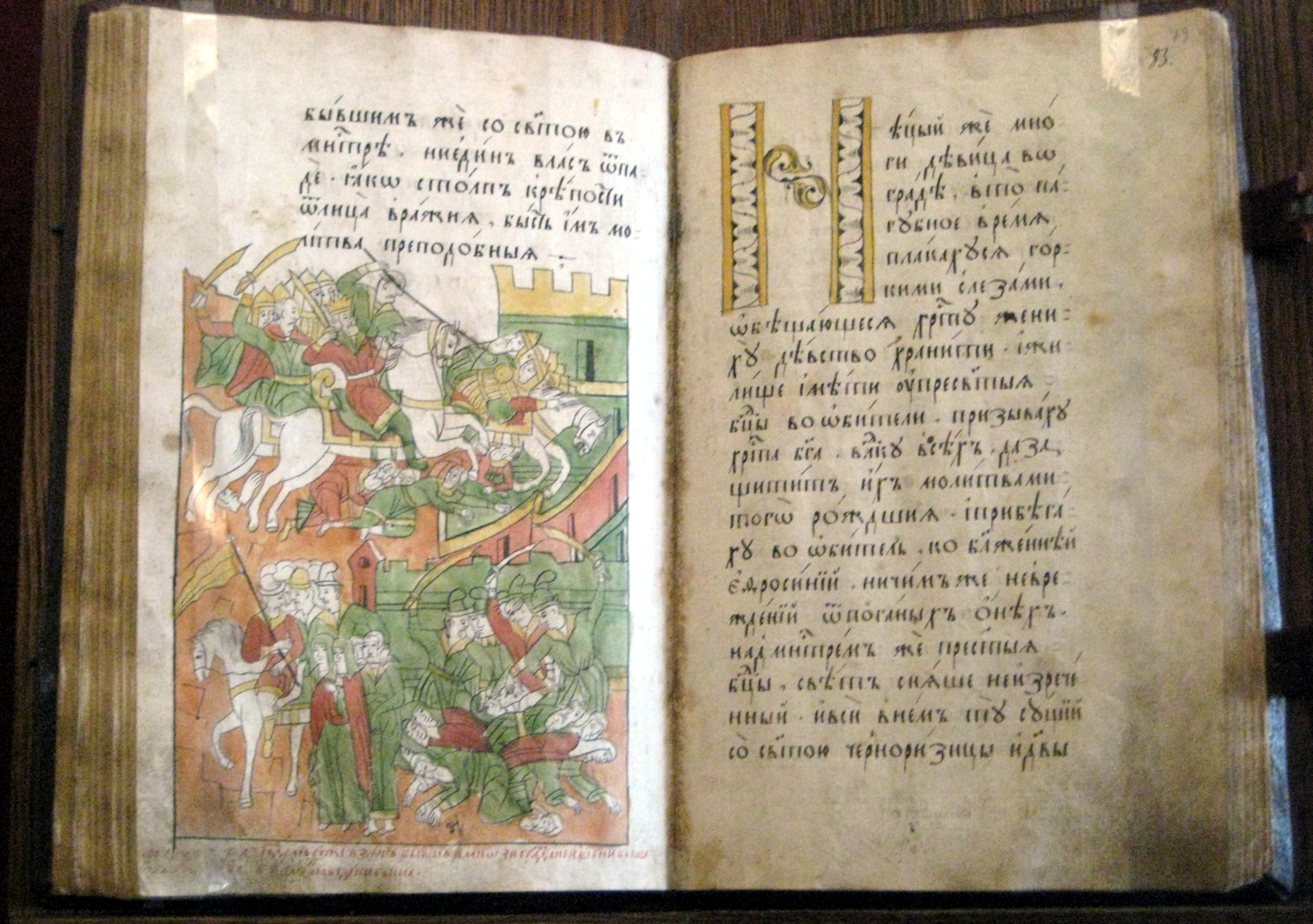
The Golden Horde raids Suzdal, miniature from The life of Euphrosyne of Suzdal

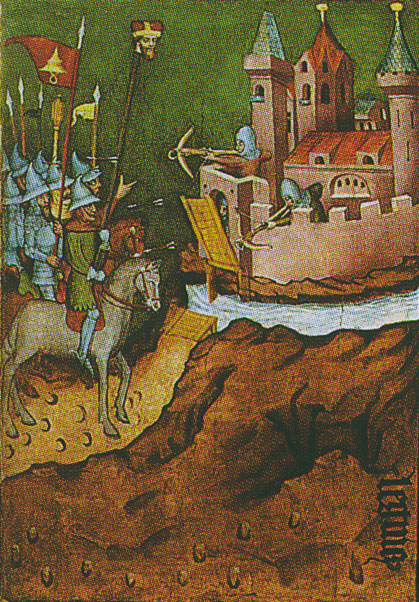
Mongol-Tatar warriors besiege their opponents, Legend of Saint Hedwig (1430)

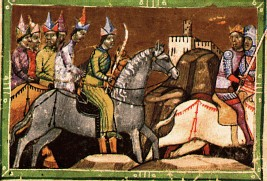
Mongols chase Hungarian king from Mohi, detail from Chronicon Pictum

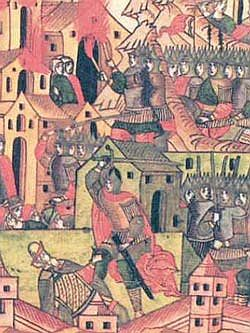
The Mongol army captures a city, miniature from the Illustrated Chronicle of Ivan the Terrible

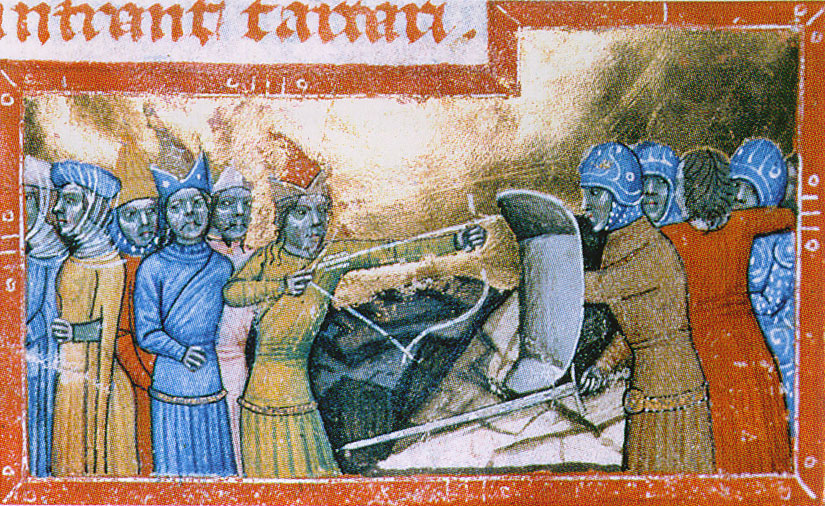
Mongol invasion of Hungary in 1285, Chronicum Pictum

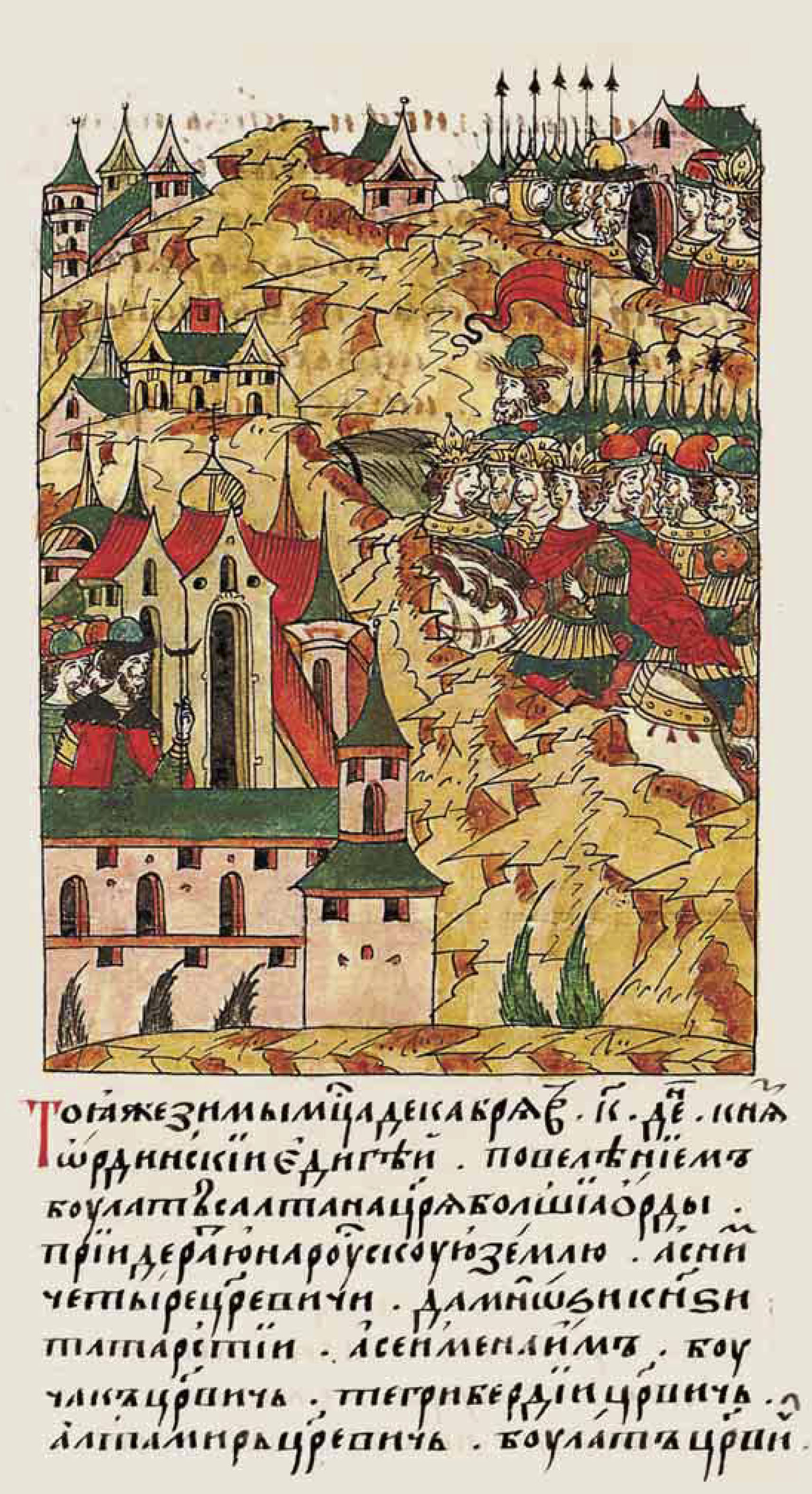
Edigu's campaign against Moscow (1408), miniature from the Illustrated Chronicle of Ivan the Terrible

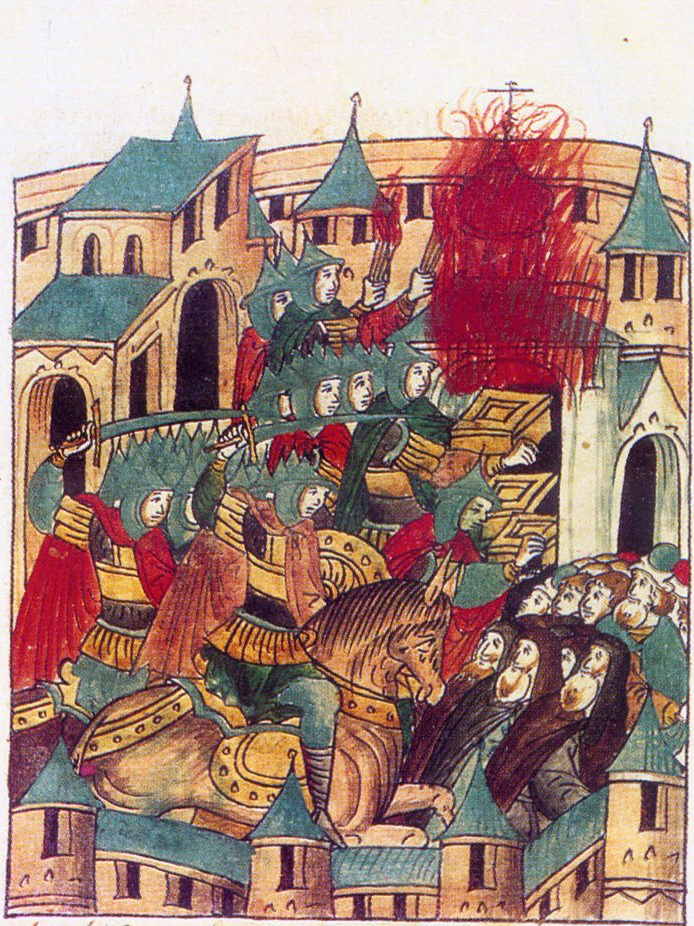
The sack of Suzdal by Batu Khan in 1238, miniature from the Illustrated Chronicle of Ivan the Terrible

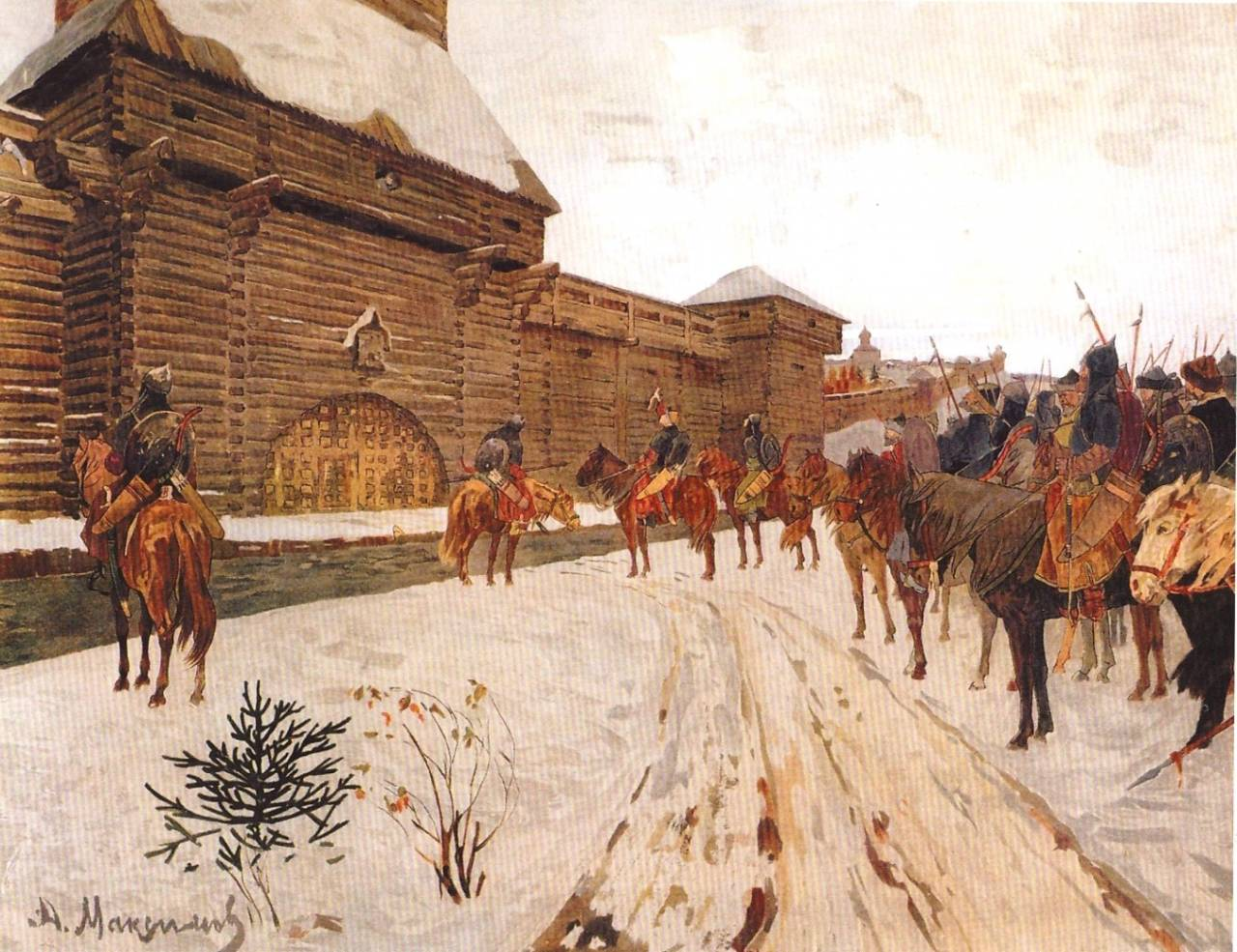
The Mongols of the Golden Horde outside Vladimir presumably demanding submission before sacking the city, painting by Vassily Maximov

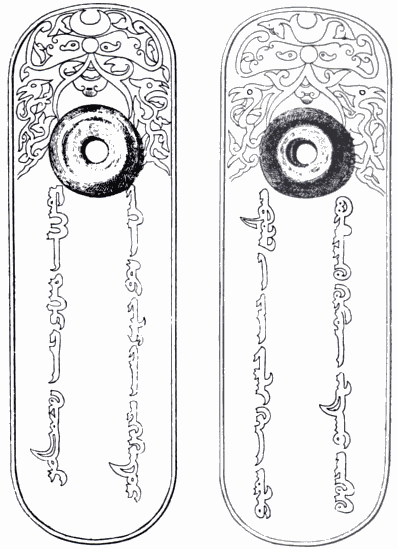
Paiza of Abdullah Khan (r. 1361–1370) with Mongolian script

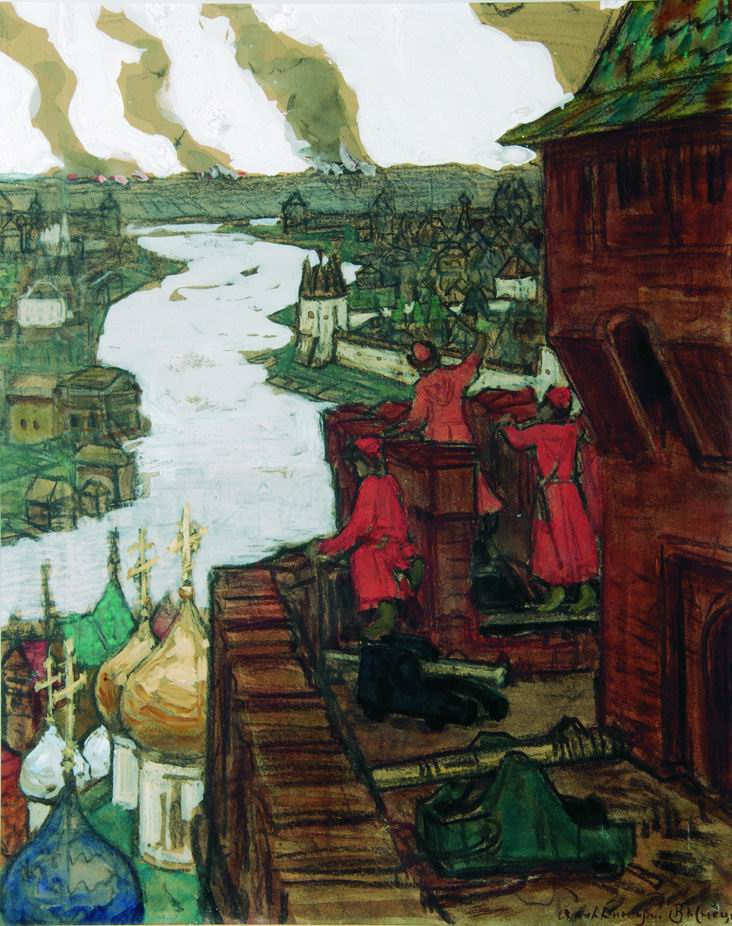
The Tatars Come, by Apollinary Vasnetsov (1909)

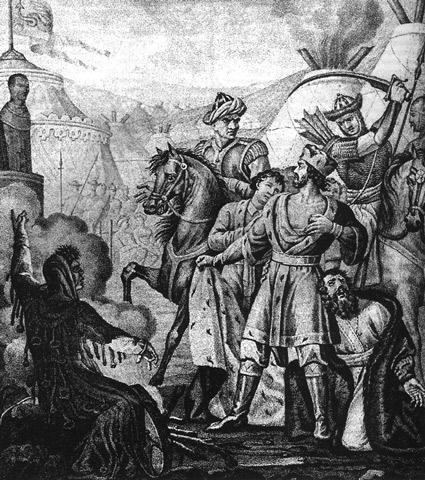
Mikhail of Tver being punished by the Golden Horde, engraving by Boris Chorikov

== See also ==
- Russo-Kazan Wars
- Lists of battles of the Mongol invasion of Europe
- History of the western steppe
- List of khans of the Golden Horde
- List of medieval Mongol tribes and clans
- List of Mongol states
- List of wars and battles involving the Golden Horde

== Sources ==
- Allsen, Thomas T. (1985). "The Princes of the Left Hand: An Introduction to the History of the Ulus of Ordu in the Thirteenth and Early Fourteenth Centuries". Archivum Eurasiae Medii Aevi. Vol. V. Harrassowitz. pp. 5–40. ISBN 978-3-447-08610-3.
- Allsen, Thomas (1994). "The rise of the Mongolian empire and Mongolian rule in north China". In Denis C. Twitchett; Herbert Franke; John King Fairbank (eds.). The Cambridge History of China: Volume 6, Alien Regimes and Border States, 710–1368. Cambridge University Press. pp. 321–413. ISBN 978-0-521-24331-5.
- Atwood, Christopher Pratt (2004). Encyclopedia of Mongolia and the Mongol Empire. Facts On File. ISBN 978-0-8160-4671-3.
- Christian, David (2018), A History of Russia, Central Asia and Mongolia 2, Wiley Blackwell
- Crummey, Robert O. (6 June 2014). The Formation of Muscovy 1300 - 1613. Routledge. ISBN 978-1-317-87200-9.
- Damgaard, P. B.; et al. (9 May 2018). "137 ancient human genomes from across the Eurasian steppes". Nature. 557 (7705). Nature Research: 369–373. Bibcode:2018Natur.557..369D. doi:10.1038/s41586-018-0094-2. hdl:1887/3202709. PMID 29743675. S2CID 13670282.
- Favereau, Marie (20 April 2021). The Horde: How the Mongols Changed the World. Harvard University Press. ISBN 978-0-674-24421-4.
- Favereau, Marie; Pochekaev, Roman Yu. (2023). "The Golden Horde, c. 1260–1502". The Cambridge History of the Mongol Empire. Cambridge University Press. pp. 243–318. ISBN 978-1-107-11648-1.
- Fennell, John (15 November 2023). The Emergence of Moscow, 1304–1359. Univ of California Press. ISBN 978-0-520-34759-5.
- Frank, Allen J. (2009), "The Western Steppe: Volga-Ural Region, Siberia and the Crimea", in Di Cosmo, Nicola; Frank, Allen J.; Golden, Peter B. (eds.), The Cambridge History of Inner Asia: The Chinggisid Age, Cambridge: Cambridge University Press, pp. 237–259
- Forsyth, James (1992), A History of the Peoples of Siberia, Cambridge University Press
- Gonneau, Pierre (30 November 2022). "Russia from the Mongol invasion to the death of Ivan the Terrible (1242–1584)". In Menjot, Denis; Caesar, Mathieu; Garnier, Florent; Pijuan, Pere Verdés (eds.). The Routledge Handbook of Public Taxation in Medieval Europe. Taylor & Francis. pp. 372–388. doi:10.4324/9781003023838-19. ISBN 978-1-000-73636-6.
- Halperin, Charles J. (1987). Russia and the Golden Horde: The Mongol Impact on Medieval Russian History. Indiana University. ISBN 978-1-85043-057-5. (1985 edition online)
- Howorth, Sir Henry Hoyle (1880). History of the Mongols: From the 9th to the 19th Century. New York: Burt Franklin.
- Iskhakov, Damir M.; Izmaylov, Iskander L. (2007). "Золотая Орда: империя и предпосылки формирования этноса". Этнополитическая история татар (III – середина XVI вв.). Kazan: Институт Истории им. Ш. Марджани АН РТ. ISBN 5-94712-030-5.
- Jackson, Peter (2014). The Mongols and the West: 1221–1410. Taylor & Francis. ISBN 978-1-317-87898-8.
- Kalra, Prajakti (20 March 2018). The Silk Road and the Political Economy of the Mongol Empire. Routledge. ISBN 978-1-351-85017-9.
- Kołodziejczyk, Dariusz (2011). The Crimean Khanate and Poland-Lithuania: International Diplomacy on the European Periphery (15th–18th Century). A Study of Peace Treaties Followed by Annotated Documents. Leiden: Brill. ISBN 978-90-04-19190-7.
- Krakowski, Stefan (1956). Polska w walce z najazdami tatarskimi w XIII wieku. Ministerstwa Obrony Narodowej.
- Lkhagvasuren, Gavaachimed; Shin, Heejin; Lee, Si Eun; Tumen, Dashtseveg; Kim, Jae-Hyun; Kim, Kyung-Yong; Kim, Kijeong; Park, Ae Ja; Lee, Ho Woon; Kim, Mi Jin; Choi, Jaesung; Choi, Jee-Hye; Min, Na Young; Lee, Kwang-Ho (2016). "Molecular Genealogy of a Mongol Queen's Family and Her Possible Kinship with Genghis Khan". PLOS ONE. 11 (9) e0161622. Bibcode:2016PLoSO..1161622L. doi:10.1371/journal.pone.0161622. PMC 5023095. PMID 27627454.
- Martin, Janet (2007). Medieval Russia, 980–1584. Cambridge University Press. ISBN 978-0-521-85916-5.
- Martin, Janet L. B. (7 June 2004). Treasure of the Land of Darkness: The Fur Trade and Its Significance for Medieval Russia. Cambridge University Press. pp. 87–88. ISBN 978-0-521-54811-3.
- May, Timothy (7 November 2016). The Mongol Empire: A Historical Encyclopedia [2 volumes]. Bloomsbury Publishing USA. ISBN 979-8-216-11905-0.
- Mirgaleyev, Ilnur (2017), "The Golden Horde and Anatolia", in Khakimov, Rafael; Favereau, Marie (eds.), The Golden Horde in World History, Kazan: Märcani Institute of History of the Tatarstan Academy of Sciences, pp. 347–351, ISBN 978-5-94981-254-9
- Shaikhutdinov, Marat (2021). Between East and West: The Formation of the Moscow State. Academic Studies Press. doi:10.2307/j.ctv249sgn2. ISBN 978-1-64469-713-9. JSTOR j.ctv249sgn2.
- Richard, Jean (2000). "Golden Horde". In Vauchez, André (ed.). Encyclopedia of the Middle Ages. Fitzroy Dearborn Publishers. pp. 619–620. ISBN 978-1-57958-282-1.
- Spinei, Victor (2017), "The Domination of the Golden Horde in the Romanian Regions", in Khakimov, Rafael; Favereau, Marie (eds.), The Golden Horde in World History, Kazan: Märcani Institute of History of the Tatarstan Academy of Sciences, pp. 394–426, ISBN 978-5-94981-254-9
- Spuler, Bertold (1943). Die Goldene Horde, die Mongolen in Russland, 1223–1502 (in German). O. Harrassowitz.
- Vásáry, István (2012). "The Crimean Khanate and the Great Horde (1440s–1500s): A Fight for Primacy" (PDF). In Meinolf Arens; Denise Klein (eds.). Das frühneuzeitliche Krimkhanat (16.-18. Jahrhundert) zwischen Orient und Okzident. Harrassowitz: Wiesbaden. pp. 13–26.
- Vásáry, István (2022), "Taxation in the Jochid Ulus", in May, Timothy; Hope, Michael (eds.), The Mongol World, London: Routledge, pp. 468–483, ISBN 978-1-351-67631-1
- Vernadsky, George (1953), The Mongols and Russia, New Haven, CT: Yale University Press
